= Bloomingdale (surname) =

Bloomingdale is a surname. Notable people with the surname include:

- Al Bloomingdale (born 1953), American player of Canadian football
- Alfred S. Bloomingdale (1916–1982), American businessman
- Betsy Bloomingdale (1922–2016), American socialite and philanthropist
- Jane Bloomingdale (born 1953), American politician
- Joseph B. Bloomingdale (1842–1904), American businessman
- Lyman G. Bloomingdale (1841–1905), American businessman
- Richard Bloomingdale, American labor union activist
- Samuel Bloomingdale (1873–1968), American businessman
- Teresa Bloomingdale (1930–2000), American humorist and writer
