= Gibney Dance =

American dance organization

- Formation: 1991; 34 years ago
- Founder: Gina Gibney
- Founded at: New York City
- Website: www. gibneydance.org

Gibney Dance, founded in 1991 by choreographer Gina Gibney, is a multi-faceted dance organization occupying two locations in New York City: one at 890 Broadway in the Flatiron District and the other at 280 Broadway in Tribeca. The organization's activities are divided into the following three interrelated fields: Center, Company, and Community. The first, Center, refers to the facility and its programming, which provide rehearsal space to nonprofit and commercial renters in addition to classes, programs, and services to the New York dance community. Company refers to Gibney Dance Company, a professional contemporary dance company operating out of the Center. Finally, Community refers to Community Action, an outreach program uniting dancers with survivors of domestic violence in shelters around New York City. In 2008, Gibney Dance was inducted into Vanity Fair's Hall of Fame for "making art and taking action".

== History ==
In 1991, choreographer Gina Gibney founded Gibney Dance in New York City as a performing and social action company. The following year, she began renting space in the historic 890 Broadway building to house her company's rehearsals. The space, then called Studio 5-2, soon became home to a roster of professional-level dance classes taught by some of the city's most sought-after teachers. Over the next two decades, Gibney and her company developed a repertory of eight evening-length works that were performed throughout the country as well as in Canada, Germany, and Turkey. From 1997 until 2007, Gibney Dance Company operated as an all-female troupe, a decision resulting from Gibney's growing concern that women in professional dance were losing artistic and financial ground. Since 2007, the company has included both men and women.

In 2000, Gibney Dance founded the Domestic Violence Project, known today as Community Action. In 2010, the Center reopened as a greatly expanded, seven-studio facility encompassing nearly the entire fifth floor of the 890 Broadway building, whose other tenants include Ballet Tech and the American Ballet Theatre. The following year, Gibney Dance began offering an array of programs designed to serve the professional dance field in New York City. In 2013, with support from The Agnes Varis Trust, Gibney Dance's Community Action reached its goal of offering 500 workshops each year to survivors of domestic violence. Also that year, the organization acquired yet another studio, bringing the facility to eight studios, making it one of the largest of its kind in New York City. In January 2014, at the invitation of the NYC Department of Cultural Affairs, Gibney Dance created a strategic plan for the revitalization of 280 Broadway in order to preserve the space for the future of dance. The organization's vision for 280 Broadway is to create a preeminent training program, a tripartite performance complex, and a springboard for social action. The new space operates in tandem with existing programs at 890 Broadway.

== Center ==
Gibney Dance 890 is a complex of nine studios located at 890 Broadway in New York City's Flatiron District. Gibney Dance 280 is a complex of fourteen studios located at 280 Broadway in Lower Manhattan. Both spaces rent studios to commercial theatre and television productions, allowing them to offer rehearsal space to nonprofit renters at subsidized rates. Ongoing ballet classes taught by Jaclynn Villamil, Janet Panetta, Sharon Milanese, Amy Miller, Martha Chapman, and Elisa Osborne are held at 890 Broadway, along with Simonson and Trisha Brown techniques, somatic practices, and a number of other contemporary class offerings at 280 Broadway. Additionally, the Center offers a roster of programs and services designed to serve New York's professional dance community, such as artist residencies, space grants, and feedback forums for choreographers.

Partner Organizations in 280 Broadway's Training Program include the Trisha Brown Dance Company, the New Dance Collective, the Playground, and Movement Research. New facilities at 280 Broadway include a center for professional development called the Learning and Leadership Studio, a hub for the organization's Community Action Program, a white-wall gallery for visual art, and a digital media workroom for artists. 280 Broadway also features three performance spaces and will host its first performance series, DoublePlus, in November and December 2014.

== Company ==
Gibney Dance Company, founded in 1991, is a professional contemporary dance company led by artistic director Gina Gibney and associate artistic director Amy Miller. The company's repertory includes eight evening-length works composed over the last decade that have been performed throughout the country and abroad. In her choreography, Gibney has collaborated with numerous artists, including composer Ryan Lott (Son Lux), lighting designer Kathy Kaufmann, costume designers Naoko Nagata and David C. Woolard, and visualist Joshue Ott.

== Gibney Dance Company Repertory ==
Time Remaining (2002), made with collaborators Kitty Brazelton (music), Kathy Kaufmann (lighting), Naoko Nagata (costumes) and Normal Group for Architecture (scenic design)

Thrown (2004), made with collaborators Andy Russ (music), Kathy Kaufmann (lighting), and Naoko Nagata (costumes)

Unbounded (2005), made with Ryan Lott (music), Kathy Kaufmann (lighting), Naoko Nagata (costumes), and Anja Hitzenberger (video)

The Distance Between Us (2007), made with collaborators Ryan Lott/Son Lux (music), Kathy Kaufmann (lighting). Naoko Nagata (costumes), and Lex Liang (scenic design)

View Partially Obstructed (2009), made with collaborators Ryan Lott/Son Lux (music), Kathy Kaufmann (lighting), Lex Liang (scenic design and costumes), and superDraw/Joshue Ott (live animation)

Concrete mécanique (2010), made with collaborators Ryan Lott/Son Lux and yMusic Chamber Ensemble (music), Kathy Kaufmann (lighting), and Lex Liang (costumes)

Dividing Line (2013), made with collaborators Ryan Lott/Son Lux and ACME (music), Kathy Kaufmann (lighting), and David C. Woolard (costumes)

== Community ==
Gibney Dance's Community Action is a unique program that unites dancers with survivors of domestic violence in a series of workshops held in shelters throughout New York City. The goal of the program is to "bring the possibility of self-expression where it would otherwise not exist." Through original movement creation and trust-building activities, Gibney Dance Company members work with survivors of domestic violence to address issues of choice, self-expression, and sharing. Since its inception in 2000, Gibney Dance's Community Action has partnered with Sanctuary for Families and Safe Horizon, two of New York's leading organizations dedicated to serving victims of domestic violence. Beyond its work in shelters, Community Action provides training sessions in its methodology both in New York and abroad. In April 2013, Gibney Dance Company travelled to Istanbul, Turkey to conduct a Community Action Residency at Mimar Sinan Fine Arts University, teaching its unique approach to empowerment through movement to Turkish dancers and social service providers. In May 2014, the Company travelled to Cape Town, South Africa to conduct its second Global Community Action Residency in partnership with iKapa Dance Theatre and the Saartjie Baartman Centre for Women and Children. In the fall of 2014, Gibney Dance opened a Community Action Hub at 280 Broadway, a facility devoted to the organization's outreach program featuring a research and workspace and a resource library.

== Gina Gibney ==
Gina Gibney, originally from Ohio, attended Case Western Reserve University, where she graduated with high honors (summa cum laude and Phi Beta Kappa) with a liberal arts degree. She went on to earn a Masters of Fine Arts degree in dance from Case Western University, where she worked with Kathryn Karipides and Kelly Holt. Her work has been honored with the Northern Ohio Live Arts Award, the Copperfoot Award for Choreography, Case Western Reserve University Young Alumni Award, Alpert Award (finalist), the OTTY (Our Town Thanks You) Arts Award, and by Sanctuary for Families, Safe Horizon and The Retreat and the Vanity Fair Hall of Fame. Gibney currently serves on the Board of Directors of Dance/NYC and Danspace Project, and has served as a Dance/USA Trustee. She is a frequent panellist and speaker on topics of dance, entrepreneurship, and social action.

Artist Statement:

"In my work, I want to reveal what it is to be human—in the most simple, basic terms. I want to create a choreographic world where strength and tenderness are equally important, where touch and separation are meaningful, and where movement takes on the quality of an intimate conversation. Much of my work is about connection. I want to create work that reminds us that we share a common environment and that our similarities are greater than our differences. As a choreographer, I am an observer. I try to look honestly at how dancers connect to movement and to the complex web of relationships. For example, I look for stillness, for that charged moment of non-movement and what that means to dancers examining their internal motivations and those of each other. I look for gestures that reach and enfold, hold and rebuff, contain and lose. I look for movement that has authenticity and weight. I look for focus that reaches deeply inward, yet is clear and open, with active awareness and a sense of reciprocity."

== Funders ==
Gibney Dance has received recognition and support from the following foundations and corporate donors: The Agnes Varis Trust, The Andrew W. Mellon Foundation, Arnhold Foundation, Booth Ferris Foundation, Bossak Heilbron Charitable Foundation, Dextra Baldwin McGonagle Foundation, Engaging Dance Audiences (administered by Dance/USA and made possible with generous funding from the Doris Duke Charitable Foundation), Doris Duke Charitable Foundation, Eileen Fisher, Emma A. Sheafer Charitable Trust, The Gramercy Park Foundation, The Harkness Foundation for Dance, The Hyde and Watson Foundation, The Jerome Robbins Foundation and Trust, Jewish Communal Fund, Joseph & Joan Cullman Foundation for the Arts, Macy's, Materials for the Arts, Mertz Gilmore Foundation, Morgan Stanley, New Music USA: Creative Connections, The New York Community Trust (Lila Acheson Wallace Theater Fund), The New York Community Trust (LuEsther T. Mertz Advised Fund), NYC Dance Response Fund (a program of Dance/NYC established by the Mertz Gilmore Foundation), New York University Community Fund, O'Donnell Green Music and Dance Foundation, Open Society Foundations, The Patrina Foundation, and Tisch Dance Summer Residency Festivals.

== Press ==
"Gibney finds in dance the proper set of incendiary devices to fuel life change, ignite new perspectives on women's roles, and hotwire the visual spectacle of live art." — Tim Duroche, Willamette Week, January 10, 2007

"With any justice, history will honor Gina Gibney Dance for exquisite, sensitive choreography that mattered in a time when so much cultural product did not" — Eva Yaa Asantewaa, Village Voice, May 8, 2001

"Gina Gibney has established herself as a poet of modern dance today" —Jennifer Dunning, The New York Times, April 21, 1998

"Vanity Fair nominates Gina Gibney Dance, because they not only make art but take action, bringing the wisdom they've acquired as dancers into the lives of women whose minds and bodies house the memory of domestic violence" — Holly Brubach, Vanity Fair, April 2008

"Who better than dancers can help to physically express the inexpressible, which sets itself against words, hidden in the withdrawal of the body and the spirit?" — Frédérique Doyon, Le Devoir, December 3, 2009

"Lower Manhattan's arts scene took a hit when Dance New Amsterdam vacated its TriBeCa home this fall. But a new tenant with equal dance-world credibility on Thursday signed a 20-year lease for the 36,000-square-foot space at 280 Broadway: choreographer Gina Gibney, founder of Gibney Dance." – Pia Catton, The Wall Street Journal, January 9, 2014

"Since 1991, Gibney Dance has grown from being a performing company to including two dance centers and a community action program that serves to give greater visibility to the issue of domestic violence. Most recently, the organization has opened a second location, Gibney 280 (located downtown Manhattan at 280 Broadway) -- the same building that housed former Dance New Amsterdam (DNA)." – Trina Mannino, The Dance Enthusiast, June 18, 2014

"Ms. Gibney is currently one of contemporary dance's most powerful figures in New York. The center of her new influence is 280 Broadway, a two-story building just north of City Hall on which she signed a lease in January. Ms. Gibney now has 17 studios, three theaters, and 51,000 square feet under her control." -Alex Traub, "The New York Observer", July 11, 2014
