= Bloomingdale's flagship store =

Department store in Manhattan, New York

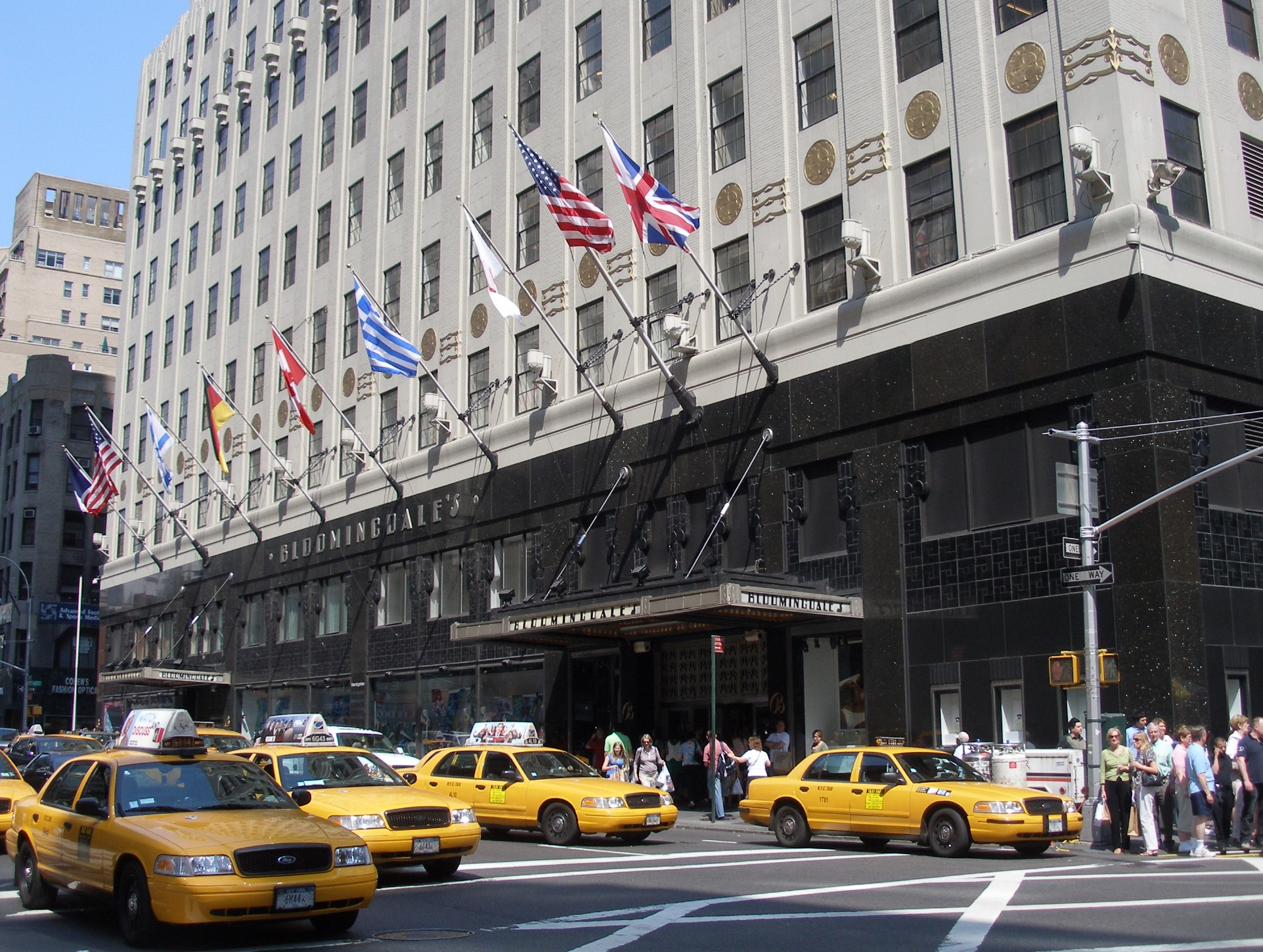
- Exterior of Bloomingdale's flagship store (2007)
- Interactive map of Bloomingdale's flagship store

General information
- Status: Open
- Type: Department store
- Architectural style: Renaissance; Art Deco
- Location: 1000 Third Avenue (59th Street and Lexington Avenue), New York City, New York, United States
- Coordinates: 40°45′43″N 73°57′59″W
- Current tenants: Bloomingdale's
- Opened: 1866
- Client: Joseph B. and Lyman Bloomingdale
- Owner: Bloomingdale family

Technical details
- Floor area: 815,000 square feet (75,700 m^{2})

Design and construction
- Architecture firm: Schwarzmann & Buchman (original building); Buchman & Deisler (1893 expansion); Starrett & Van Vleck (1930 expansion)

The Bloomingdale's flagship store is a department store between Third and Lexington Avenues, and 59th and 60th Streets on the border of the Upper East Side and Midtown Manhattan in New York City. It was designed by Herman J. Schwarzmann and Albert Buchman for Joseph B. and Lyman Bloomingdale, and opened in 1886; it was expanded in 1893 and 1930. The store spans 815,000 square feet (75,700 m^{2}), of which 555,000 square feet (51,600 m^{2}) is selling space, and occupies nearly an entire city block. It remains the flagship store and headquarters of the Bloomingdale's department store chain, founded in 1861 and owned by Macy's, Inc. since 1930. (Note: Macy's, Inc. was named Federated Department Stores from 1929 until 2007.)

== History ==
The present-day Bloomingdale's flagship store originated as the third relocation of the Bloomingdale's Great East Side Bazaar founded by Joseph B. and Lyman Bloomingdale.

== Architecture ==
Buchman & Deisler designed the 1893 expansion in the Renaissance style, and included an annex and a wing that extended to 59th Street. Starrett & Van Vleck expanded the store to occupy the entire city block with the 1930 expansion, which also added the signature Art Deco facade along Lexington Avenue. The original construction and subsequent additions were described as "a complete mess architecturally" by architect William J. Conklin in the 1980s, however Federated Department Stores did not move forward with his exterior restoration plans at that time.
