= Wallenstein (disambiguation) =

Albrecht von Wallenstein (1583–1634) was a Bohemian military leader and politician.

Wallenstein may also refer to:

- Works on the life of Albrecht von Wallenstein:
  - Wallenstein (trilogy of plays), an 1800 work by Friedrich Schiller
  - Wallenstein (novel), a 1920 work by Alfred Döblin
  - Wallenstein (film), a 1925 German silent historical film
- Wallenstein, an 1876 opera by Luigi Denza
- Wallenstein (Weinberger), a 1937 opera by Jaromir Weinberger
- Wallenstein (band), a German rock band
- Wallenstein (board game), a medium-weight German-style board game
- Wallenstein, Ontario

== People with the surname ==
- Esther Wallenstein (1846–1903), German-American care worker
- Alfred Wallenstein (1898–1983), American cellist and conductor
- Herbert J. Wallenstein (1917–1996), American legal officer
- Peter Wallenstein, American author and history professor
- Catarina Wallenstein (born 1986), Portuguese actress

== See also ==
- Wallerstein (disambiguation)
