= Edgar M. Cullman =

American businessman (1918–2011)

- Born: Edgar Meyer Cullman; January 7, 1918
- Died: August 28, 2011 (aged 93); Stamford, Connecticut, U.S.
- Occupation: Businessman
- Known for: President and CEO of General Cigar Company
- Children: Edgar M. Cullman Jr. Lucy Cullman Danziger; Susan Cullman Kirby
- Relatives: Samuel Bloomingdale (father-in-law); Joseph Cullman III (brother); Dorothy Cullman (sister-in-law); John Kirby (son-in-law)

Edgar Meyer Cullman (January 7, 1918 – August 28, 2011) was an American businessman who was president and CEO of General Cigar Company and is credited with transforming the image of cigars.

== Biography ==
Edgar Meyer Cullman was born to a Jewish family on January 7, 1918, the son of the son of Francis Nathan Wolff and Joseph Cullman Jr. He comes from a family that was deeply involved in the tobacco business. His great-grandfather was the wine and tobacco merchant Ferdinand Kullman who emigrated to the United States in 1848. His grandfather and uncle, Joseph and Jacob, founded the tobacco brokerage house Cullman Brothers in 1892. His father owned farmland in the Connecticut River Valley that grew the tobacco used for cigar wrappers. In 1929, his father purchased the Webster Tobacco Company after the 1929 stock market collapse and in 1941, his father and uncle, Howard S. Cullman, founded the investment company Cullman Brothers Incorporated to purchase Benson & Hedges. He had two brothers: Joseph Frederick Cullman III, who was chairman and CEO of Philip Morris; and Lewis B. Cullman (married to Dorothy Cullman), known as the "father of the leveraged buyout."

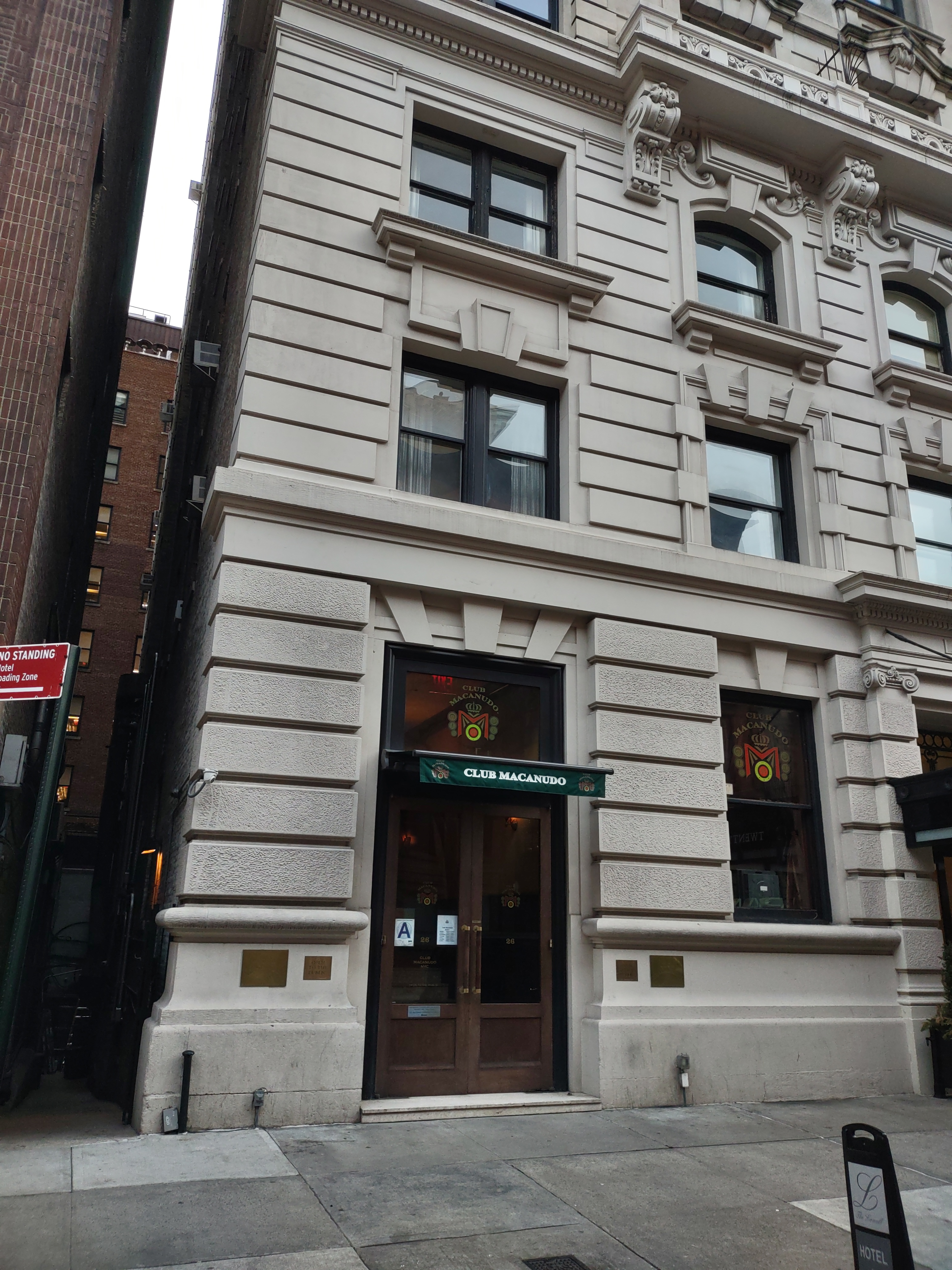
Club Macanudo in 2024

In 1940, Cullman earned a B.A. in economics from Yale University in 1940. After school, his father secured him an entry-level job hand-rolling cigars at H. Anton Bock in Manhattan. In 1961, Cullman and a group of investors bought for $25 million a controlling interest in then the 2nd-largest cigar producer in the United States, New-York-based General Cigar Company which owned the brands White Owl, Tiparillo, Tijuana Smalls, and Macanudo. In 1962, he was elected president and CEO of General Cigar; he grew sales at the company from $70 million and 11% market share in 1963 to $220 million in 1967. General Cigar benefited from the switch of many tobacco consumers from cigarettes to cigars propelled by a 1964 surgeon general's report that demonstrated a link between cigarette smoking and cancer; and introduced smaller and milder cigars to attract cigarette smokers and the young market. In 1976, the company's name was changed to Culbro Corporation and he diversified the company into snack foods, Ex-Lax, packaging, real estate, and in 1996, opened the cigar club Club Macanudo in Manhattan. In 1981, he retired as president but remained as CEO until 2005 when the company was sold to Swedish Match. He died on August 28, 2011, in Stamford, Connecticut, aged 93.

== Personal life ==
In 1938, he married Louise Bloomingdale (1919–2014), granddaughter of Lyman Bloomingdale; they had three children, Edgar Cullman Jr., Lucy Cullman Danziger, and Susan Cullman Kirby (married to attorney John Kirby). His son Edgar is married to interior designer Elissa Cullman, daughter of restaurateur Sol Forman who owned Peter Luger Steak House and whose siblings still own and operate the restaurant.
