= Samuel Bloomingdale =

American businessman

- Born: Samuel Joseph Bloomingdale; June 17, 1873; New York City, New York, US
- Died: May 10, 1968 (aged 94); New York City, New York, US
- Education: Columbia University
- Occupation: Retail businessman
- Known for: President and chairman of Bloomingdales Department Store
- Spouse: Rita G. Goodman
- Parent(s): Lyman Bloomingdale; Hattie Colenberg Bloomingdale
- Family: Joseph B. Bloomingdale (uncle); Alfred S. Bloomingdale (nephew); Edgar M. Cullman (son-in-law)

Samuel Joseph Bloomingdale (June 17, 1873 – May 10, 1968) was an American heir to the Bloomingdale's department store fortune and president of Bloomingdale's from 1905 to 1930.

== Early life and education ==
Bloomingdale was born to Lyman Bloomingdale, founder of the Bloomingdale's department store, and Hattie Colenberg Bloomingdale, on June 17, 1873, at 938 Third Avenue, the first location of the family-owned department store. He was educated at private schools and graduated from Columbia University in 1895, where he studied architecture. However, after consultation with Dean William Robert Ware of the Columbia School of Architecture, he decided against becoming an architect and joined the family business.

== Career ==
Upon his father's death, Bloomingdale became president of the department store in 1905. During his 25-year tenure, he oversaw the expansion of the department store and undertook a large scale reconstruction of the store into a modern eight-story structure occupying the entire block from 59th to 60th street between Lexington Avenue and Third Avenue. As president, Bloomingdale was recognized as a pioneer of advertisement, which helped quintuple the sales volume of Bloomingdale's to $25 million annually. The department store was also the first in New York City to welcome an outside union.

In 1930, the store joined the chain of Federated Department Stores and Bloomingdale became a director of the company until 1962. He remained a chairman of Bloomingdale's until 1943 and became the honorary chairman thereafter.

== Philanthropy ==
Bloomingdale was a trustee of the Federation of Jewish Philanthropies and Montefiore Medical Center, and was active in the American Jewish Committee.

== Personal life ==
Bloomingdale died on May 10, 1968. He was a member of the Century Association, Harmonie Club, Salmagundi Club, Quaker Ridge Golf Club, and Congregation Emanu-El of New York.

He married Rita G. Goodman in 1916 and had two daughters:

- Susan Bloomingdale, who married investor Richard C. Ernst
- Louise Bloomingdale, who married Edgar M. Cullman, president of the General Cigar Company
