= Vicki Morgan =

American model

- Born: Victoria Lynn Morgan; August 9, 1952; Colorado Springs, Colorado, U.S.
- Died: July 7, 1983 (aged 30); Los Angeles, California, U.S.
- Cause of death: Homicide
- Occupations: Mistress, sex worker
- Children: 1

Victoria Lynn Morgan (August 9, 1952 – July 7, 1983) was the mistress of Alfred S. Bloomingdale, heir to the Bloomingdale's department store fortune. The details of their tumultuous relationship became known after Morgan sued Bloomingdale's estate for palimony in 1982. Morgan was murdered in 1983 by Marvin Pancoast, her roommate and occasional lover who was sentenced to prison.

== Early life ==
Vicki Morgan was born in Colorado Springs, Colorado. Her mother, Constance Laney, and Vicki's father, a United States Air Force veteran, divorced soon after Vicki's birth. Constance remarried, but that husband died when Vicki was about 9 years old. Vicki and her mother relocated to Montclair, California. At 16, Vicki Morgan became pregnant, dropped out of Chaffey High School, and gave birth to a son, Todd. Leaving Todd with her mother, Morgan ran away from home in 1968.

== Bloomingdale mistress ==
She found work as an usher at Grauman's Chinese Theatre in Los Angeles. She soon married 47-year-old Earl Lamb.

In August 1969, while still 17, Morgan met 53-year-old financier Alfred S. Bloomingdale, a married multi-millionaire from the famous department store family, in a restaurant on the Sunset Strip. Bloomingdale soon took Morgan as a mistress, and would have her watch as he lashed naked prostitutes with his belt. When Morgan was 18, Bloomingdale offered Lamb a large cash payment to end his marriage with Morgan. Bloomingdale provided an apartment for her.

As Bloomingdale's mistress, her social circle would include politicians, businessmen, and the wealthy playboy Bernie Cornfeld. With Bloomingdale's financial support, she lived a lavish lifestyle. In 1973, Bloomingdale's wife, Betsy, learned of her husband's affair and told him to break off the relationship. He complied, and Morgan spiraled into poverty and depression.

By 1979, Morgan had been through two more marriages and long periods of sex work, and had become a drug addict. That year she entered rehabilitation, where she met Marvin Pancoast, a gay man who was infatuated with Morgan and her stories of the high life she led with Bloomingdale. They vowed to live together once released from treatment. Three years later, Bloomingdale was diagnosed with terminal cancer. He purportedly told Morgan that he had only two months to live and assured her she would be well cared for and never have to worry about money again.

== Palimony and murder ==
The financial situation for the 30-year-old Morgan quickly turned desperate. To protect herself, she hired the famous Hollywood palimony attorney Marvin Mitchelson to file an $11 million lawsuit ($36.7 million today) for financial compensation as Bloomingdale's mistress. The pre-trial media coverage of the initial complaint revealed details of the couple's sexual relationship that grabbed headlines nationwide, causing particular embarrassment amongst Bloomingdale's friends in Washington, D.C. However, when Morgan learned that Mitchelson had dinner and a meeting with President Ronald Reagan and his wife Nancy – the latter of whom was friends with Betsy Bloomingdale – Morgan lost trust in Mitchelson, fired him, and hired attorney Robert Steinberg in his place.

Later court documents and news stories revealed that Morgan supported herself by selling off the jewelry and the expensive car purchased for her by Bloomingdale. It was later reported that she was preparing to write a tell-all book which was going to name influential politicians and businessmen who had been clients of hers. Bloomingdale died of cancer less than two months after the lawsuit was filed.

Morgan contacted her friend from rehab, Marvin Pancoast, and moved into an apartment with him. She returned to working as a prostitute while he worked odd jobs. Although Pancoast was a homosexual, their relationship was occasionally sexual. Pancoast thought he had contracted HIV and was terminally ill. He was distraught and unstable after his daily counseling sessions were terminated by psychiatrist Dr. Paul Cantalupo.

On the evening of July 7, 1983, less than eleven months after Bloomingdale's death, Pancoast walked into a police station and confessed to murdering Morgan in their apartment. Police found Morgan, apparently beaten to death with a baseball bat. She was buried at the Forest Lawn Memorial Park, Hollywood Hills. Pancoast was sentenced to 26 years-to-life in prison and died in 1991 in Chino, California, while undergoing treatment for AIDS-related illnesses.

Morgan's 1982 palimony lawsuit against Bloomingdale's estate continued on behalf of her son Todd (born c. 1968). She had referred to a contract in which Bloomingdale would have given her $240,000, but instead she was given $40,000. During the trial, the judge ruled the agreement unenforceable as it was for the illegal act of "sex for hire." In December 1984, a jury awarded Morgan's estate the remaining $200,000 ($620,000 today).

== In popular media ==
- Morgan's story received considerable print coverage and in 1985 author Gordon Basichis wrote the book Beautiful Bad Girl: The Vicki Morgan Story. In 1990, Dominick Dunne wrote a fictional portrayal of Morgan in his book, An Inconvenient Woman. The story of her life and death was the topic of Vanity Fair Confidential (Season 4, Episode 7: Murder Most Obsessive) which first aired on March 19, 2018. Her BDSM-based relationships with Alfred Bloomingdale and Marvin Pancoast are also explored in the Poisoned Passions episode "Sadistic Pleasure".
- Morgan's story is mentioned in the 1996 film The People vs. Larry Flynt in a courtroom scene in which Larry is asked about his source of the John DeLorean video.
- In the feature film Fletch (1985), Chevy Chase's character Fletch mentions "Vicki Morgan tapes" when talking to his boss about two witnesses rummaging through his boss's office.
- The Song "Der Mord an Vicky Morgan" from the German music group Die Toten Hosen is based on the story of Vicki Morgan.
- In 2023, Morgan's story was covered by the true crime podcast Swindled.
