= Herbert J. Wallenstein =

American lawyer

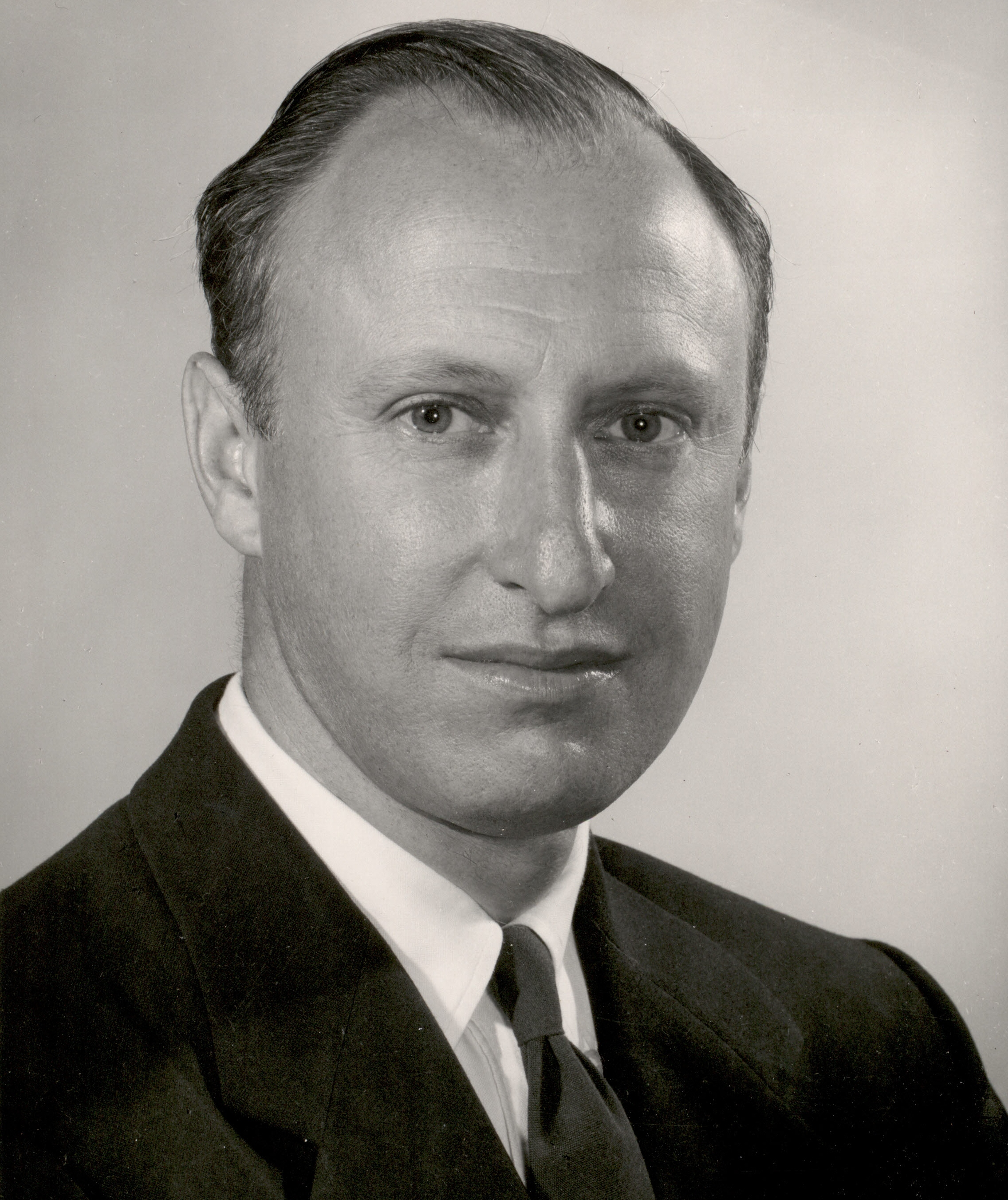
- Herbert J. Wallenstein

Assistant New York State Attorney General
- In office 1959–1979

Personal details
- Born: August 1, 1917 Manhattan
- Died: February 18, 1996 (aged 78) Delray Beach, Florida
- Party: Republican
- Spouse: Elaine P. Silverman (1924–2020) m. 1947
- Education: CUNY, New York University
- Profession: attorney

Military service
- Branch/service: United States Army
- Years of service: 1943–1946

Herbert Joseph Wallenstein (August 1, 1917 – February 18, 1996) was an Assistant New York State Attorney General from 1959 to 1979 and the first Bureau Chief of the State Charity Frauds Bureau.

Born in Manhattan to Joseph S. Wallenstein (December 15, 1869 – May 1, 1928), a cigar and leather merchant, and Martha Schallek (May 24, 1884 – January 7, 1969), Herbert Wallenstein's paternal grandmother was Esther Wallenstein(1846-July 8, 1903), the founding president of the Hebrew Infant Asylum, a prominent Jewish orphanage in New York City.

After growing up in Morningside Heights and attending New York City public schools and Townsend Harris High School, he graduated from CCNY in 1939 and received a Bachelor of Laws (LL.B)in 1942 from New York University Law School. He was admitted to the New York State Bar just before being drafted into the United States Army. Wallenstein served in the Army during World War II and was honorably discharged in 1946. Following the war, he went back to NYU Law School where he received his Master of Laws in 1951 on the GI Bill.

In 1957, and again in 1958, Wallenstein was an unsuccessful candidate for Municipal Court Judge in New York's 7th District. Following the 1958 campaign, he left a private practice when he was appointed an Assistant Attorney General in the office of New York State Attorney General Louis J. Lefkowitz (July 3, 1904 – June 20, 1996).

Wallenstein was the Republican nominee in 1970 against New York State Assemblyman John J. Walsh in the 73rd Assembly District, an overwhelmingly Democratic district containing Washington Heights.

By 1969, as the head of the Attorney General's Charity Fraud Bureau, he worked on a number of notable cases, including the Children of God cult case in 1973. By 1974, he was the first Bureau Chief of the Charity Fraud Bureau, serving in that position until his retirement in 1979.

After his retirement from the Attorney General's office, Wallenstein went into private practice for the remainder of his career and retired to Florida, where he died on February 18, 1996.

He was survived by his wife of 48 years, the former Elaine Silverman (October. 11, 1924 - March 31, 2020), two children and two grandchildren.
