= Esther Wallenstein =

American orphanage owner (1846–1903)

Esther Hellman Wallenstein
- Born: November , 1846; Bavaria, Germany
- Died: July 8, 1903 (aged 56)
- Burial place: Beth El Cemetery, Ridgewood, Queens
- Years active: 1895 -1903
- Employer: Hebrew Infant Asylum
- Organization(s): Hebrew Sheltering Guarding Society, Ahavath Chesed Sisterhood of Personal Service, United Hebrew Charities
- Title: President
- Spouse: Solomon Wallenstein
- Children: 4
- Relatives: Herbert J. Wallenstein

Esther Hellman Wallenstein (November 1846 – July 8, 1903) was the founding president of the Hebrew Infant Asylum, an orphanage in New York City.

Born in Bavaria, Germany, in 1846, she emigrated to the United States around 1862 and married Solomon Wallenstein (1831 – July 30, 1905), a tobacconist, in 1865. They had four children: Jennie Wallenstein Kohnstamm (August 21, 1866 – October 26, 1954); Joseph Solomon Wallenstein (December 15, 1869 – May 1, 1928); Max W. Wallenstein (December 15, 1867 – February 8, 1952); and Milton H. Wallenstein (June 30, 1876 – July 2, 1948).

As a member of the Hebrew Sheltering Guarding Society and a guide of the Ahavath Chesed Sisterhood of Personal Service, Wallenstein had been approached for help by parents of infants for years. She enlisted the help of the United Hebrew Charities and many wealthy Jewish New Yorkers. On October 25, 1892, Wallenstein and others formed a "committee on permanent organization". Two weeks later, the Hebrew Infant Asylum was organized, with Wallenstein as president.

The original objective of the asylum – which began with 250 members – was "to receive and take charge of infants in cases where parent or parents are dead or unable or incompetent to afford to the infant the nursing and attention which they merit, and to care for their religious, physical and moral training."

After a reorganization and some well placed political intervention, the Asylum was finally granted a charter on April 17, 1895. Within only a few years of its founding, the board of directors of the Asylum could count among its membership Lyman G. Bloomingdale (1841–1905), a co-founder of Bloomingdale’s department store and Isidor Straus (February 6, 1845 – April 15, 1912), a co-owner of Macy's department store.

On May 26, 1895, the Hebrew Infant Asylum was dedicated at well attended ceremony at its new home on Mott Avenue and 149th Street in the Bronx (today the site of Hostos Community College). Wallenstein gave welcoming remarks in her original German, where she declared "the Hebrew Infant Asylum of the City of New York formally opened for the reception of those unfortunate little creatures to whom that blessing has been denied, to call the sweet names, 'Papa—Mama'; but we will endeavor to take the place of parents for those innocent infants with the aid of our Heavenly Father." She was presented with a portrait of herself by the board, which was thereafter hung in the new Asylum.

Wallenstein ran the Hebrew Infant Asylum for the next eight years, until her sudden death at the age of 57 on July 8, 1903. She is buried in Beth El Cemetery in Ridgewood, Queens along with Solomon, their four children and their spouses – and two grandchildren.

In the years that followed, Wallenstein's children stayed active in the Hebrew Infant Asylum (Joseph and Jennie remained on the board. Joseph ran the Young Folks League for Aid to Hebrew Infants, an arm of the Asylum). The Asylum moved to a new location at University Avenue and Kingsbridge Road in the Bronx in 1898. By 1942 it merged with the Jewish Child Care Association. The records of the Asylum are now housed at the American Jewish Historical Society in New York City.

One of Wallenstein's grandchildren, Herbert J. Wallenstein (August 1, 1917 – February 18, 1996) went on to become an Assistant Attorney General and the Bureau Chief of the Charity Frauds Bureau under New York State Attorney General Louis J. Lefkowitz (July 3, 1904 – June 20, 1996). He was also a candidate for New York State Assembly and Municipal Court Judge in Manhattan.
