= Dorothy Cullman =

American television producer (1918–2009)

- Born: Dorothy Freedman; February 18, 1918; New York City, New York, United States
- Died: April 6, 2009 (aged 91); New York City, New York
- Known for: Philanthropy
- Spouse(s): Charles Benenson (1942 –1957 ) Lewis B. Cullman (1963 – her death)
- Family: Joseph Cullman (brother-in-law); Edgar M. Cullman (brother-in-law)

Dorothy Cullman (February 18, 1918 – April 6, 2009) was an American television producer and philanthropist. She and her husband, Lewis B. Cullman (January 26, 1919 – June 7, 2019), contributed a combined $250 million to numerous organizations over forty years. She served on the boards of several arts-related organizations, and produced several television programs which were broadcast on WNET.

In 2006 the Museum of Modern Art in New York named a building after them: The Lewis B. and Dorothy Cullman Education and Research Building.

== Early lives ==
Born Dorothy Freedman in Manhattan, New York, she was the daughter of William and Lois Freedman. In her early years, she modeled for Saks Fifth Avenue and studied drama. She attended Rollins College in the 1930s for two years. After attending college, she returned to New York where she married Charles Benenson in 1942. They were later divorced, and she remarried in 1963 to Lewis B. Cullman.

Lewis B. Cullman was a scion to the family that owned the Benson & Hedges and Philip Morris tobacco companies, as were his brothers, Joseph Cullman and Edgar M. Cullman. He studied meteorology at New York University before joining the Navy in World War II, where he continued doing weather forecasting, and after the war started a weather service in New England. Cullman married Thais MacBride in 1942. They divorced in 1957. Reluctant to join the family tobacco business, he would ultimately found Cullman Ventures, which invested in start-up companies. He pocketed $300 million when he sold the company in 1999.

Both Cullman and Freedman were raising funds for the World Federation for Mental Health when they met.

== Philanthropy ==
The Cullmans donated a combined $250 million to a number of organizations in support of the arts, science and education. Beneficiaries included the American Museum of Natural History, the New York Botanical Gardens, Mount Sinai Medical Center and Yale University. In 2000, the Cullmans donated $10 million to the Neurosciences Institute. In 2001, they donated $1 million to the Parrish Art Museum to support an additional curator for the organization. In addition to their monetary donations, they also donated several pieces of art to the Museum of Modern Art. On November 28, 2006, a new building built by the Museum of Modern Art was opened, which was named after the Cullmans.

When discussing contributions to the New York Public Library for the Performing Arts at the Lincoln Center, Cullman said that funds were given honoring Brooke Astor, "to recognize her enormous contributions to poetry, the library and New York". Dorothy Cullman was responsible for devising what became a humanities center in the library, supported by 15 scholars and annual funding for research.

During her lifetime, she served on the boards of the American Academy in Rome, the American Museum of Natural History, the Enterprise Foundation's New York Committee, the Film Society of Lincoln Center, and the New York Public Library . Dorothy Cullman contributed to WNET, supporting several arts-related programs on shows such as Great Performances and American Masters.

== Later lives ==
Dorothy Cullman died on April 6, 2009, of a brain injury, prompted by an earlier fall she had suffered. In 2010, Lewis Cullman married Louise Kerz Hirschfeld, the widow of Al Hirschfeld, an American caricaturist. He died in 2019 at Stamford Hospital in Connecticut at age 100.

== See also ==
- Howard S. Cullman
