= Charles Benenson =

American businessman (1913–2004)

Charles B. Benenson
- Born: January 30, 1913
- Died: February 22, 2004 (aged 91); Palm Beach, Florida
- Education: B.A. Yale University
- Occupation: Real estate investor
- Known for: president of Benenson Realty Co
- Spouses: Dorothy Freedman (divorced); Jane Garcy Stein (until death)
- Partner: Peggy A. Lipson Coudert
- Children: with Freedman: --Bruce William Benenson --Frederick Benenson with Lipson Coudert: --Lawrence Benenson
- Parent: Benjamin Benenson
- Website: benensoncapital.com

Charles B. Benenson (30 January 1913 – 22 February 2004) was an American real estate developer and investor.

== Biography ==
Benenson Realty Co. was founded by his father Benjamin Benenson in 1905 and grew into an industry leader under his guidance, until his death in 1938. The younger Benenson graduated from Yale University in 1933 and joined his father's firm in 1937, during the depths of the Great Depression through which the company survived due to their lucrative lease with The Horn & Hardart automat at 31st and Broadway. He ran the company until his death in 2004.

Benenson was a philanthropist and political donor. His efforts and views landed him on the master list of Nixon political opponents. He founded the Coalition Against Double Taxation in the 1980s in response to a proposal in Congress which would eradicate state and local income taxes as deductions. The coalition successfully quashed the measure, later becoming the National Realty Committee (NRC), then The Real Estate Roundtable. He was a founding member of the Association for a Better New York, the Realty Foundation, the Lincoln Center Real Estate and Construction Council, the New York Junior Tennis League, the I Have a Dream Program, and the Museum of African Art.

He was also a significant collector of African art, bequeathing much of his collection to the Yale University Art Gallery.

== Personal life ==
In 1942, he married his first wife, Dorothy (née Freedman) with whom he had two children: Bruce William Benenson and Frederick C. Benenson. They later divorced (she remarried to Lewis B. Cullman). His second marriage was to Peggy A. (née Lipson) Coudert; they had one son, Lawrence B. Benenson. His third wife was Jane (née Garcy) Stein. His funeral was held at Temple Emanu-El in Manhattan.
