= Walerstein =

Walerstein is a Jewish surname. Notable people with the surname include:

- Gregorio Walerstein (1913–2002), Mexican film producer and screenwriter
- Marcela Walerstein (born 1971), Venezuelan actress.
- Mauricio Walerstein (1945–2016), Mexican film director, screenwriter and film producer

== See also ==
- Wallerstein (disambiguation)
