= Betsy Bloomingdale =

American socialite (1922–2016)

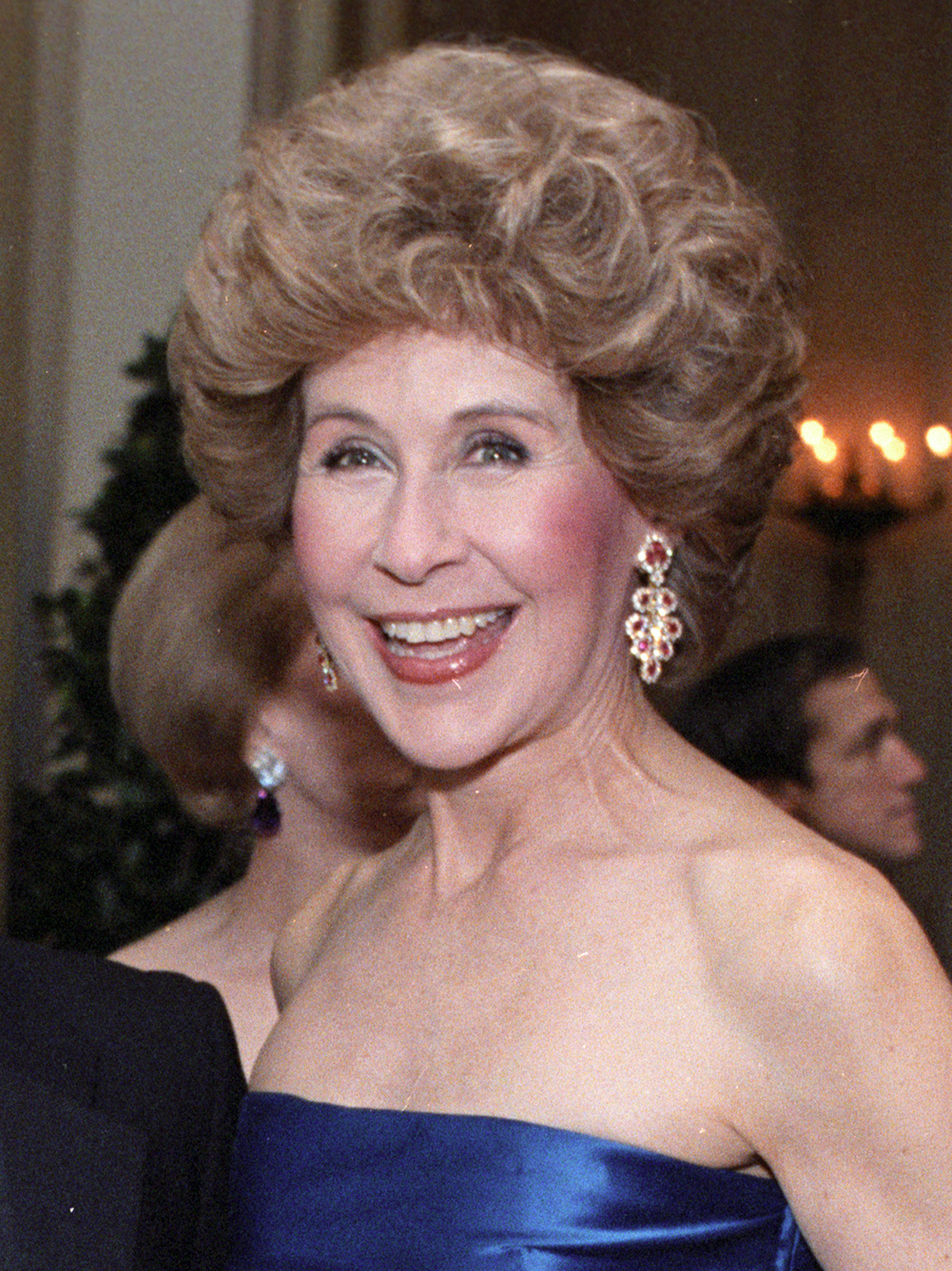
- Bloomingdale in 1981
- Born: Betty Lee Newling; August 2, 1922; Beverly Hills, California, U.S.
- Died: July 19, 2016 (aged 93); Los Angeles, California, U.S.
- Occupation: Philanthropist
- Spouse: Alfred S. Bloomingdale (m. 1946; died 1982)
- Children: 3

Betsy Bloomingdale (born Betty Lee Newling; August 2, 1922 – July 19, 2016) was an American socialite and philanthropist. She was considered a fashion icon, first appearing on the International Best Dressed List in 1962, and in 1970 was named in the list's Hall of Fame.

== Life ==
Bloomingdale was born Betty Lee Newling on August 2, 1922, in Beverly Hills, California. She was the only child of Vera (née Browner) and Russell Lee Newling, both born in Australia. Bloomingdale attended the Marlborough School in Hancock Park, and the secondary women's Bennett College in Millbrook, New York.

On September 14, 1946, she married Alfred S. Bloomingdale, the son of Rosalind (née Schiffer) and Hiram Bloomingdale, and the grandson of Lyman G. Bloomingdale, a co-founder of the department store Bloomingdale's. The couple purchased their Holmby Hills home in 1958, following its renovations by interior designer William Haines. During their marriage, the couple had three children:

- Geoffrey Bloomingdale (born 1950), who married Elizabeth Fahr in 1972
- Lisa Bloomingdale (born 1951), who married R. McKim "Kim" Bell in 1974
- Robert Russell Bloomingdale (born 1954), who married Justine Hayward Schmidt in 1979

Bloomingdale died on July 19, 2016, at her home in Holmby Hills, Los Angeles, from complications from congestive heart failure. She was 93 years old.

== Public image and legacy ==
Her social circle included Nancy Reagan, Joan Collins, Joan Rivers, Lauren Bacall and Nan Kempner. Her friendship with Reagan began in the 1950s, and was so close that Bloomingdale became known as the "First Friend" during the Reagan presidency. She frequently provided fashion, decorating and style advice to the First Lady.

In the early 1960s, Bloomingdale began travelling to Paris regularly to view and purchase haute couture clothing. Over the coming decades, she amassed a collection of over 100 gowns and outfits. Bloomingdale is credited for introducing fashion designer Adolfo to Duchess of Windsor, Wallis Simpson in 1965, and Nancy Regan in 1967. In 1975, Bloomingdale was charged by U.S. customs officials for falsely declaring the value of two imported Dior haute couture gowns; she pleaded guilty to concealing an invoice from federal customs officials and was fined. In 1977, Bloomindgale debuted a line of flower‐strewn robes, which were sold to Bloomingdale's and Bergdorf's.

When her husband died of cancer, a media scandal ensued over his estate. Bloomingdale had cut off a financial allowance to her husband's mistress Vicki Morgan in 1981. On his death, Morgan took her 12-year relationship with Alfred public. She sued his estate and widow for $10 million, claiming that Alfred had promised her lifetime support. Most of the suit was dismissed in 1983, but after Morgan was murdered the following year, a jury awarded $200,000 to her estate. Bloomingdale's life, marriage and the affair were the basis of Dominick Dunne's novel An Inconvenient Woman.

Bloomingdale was a frequent party host, mainly for charity, for which she was dubbed "Good Queen Betts". She was well known for her attention to detail, keeping copious notes of each dinner party she hosted, including a photo of the place setting, the menu, the seating arrangement, and her outfit, so that guests would never dine on the same dishes or see her in the same gown twice. Bloomingdale published a book on entertaining and hosting, Entertaining With Betsy Bloomingdale: A Collection of Culinary Tips and Treasures From the World’s Best Hosts and Hostesses, in 1994.

A practicing Roman Catholic, she was involved in fundraising projects for the Los Angeles Cathedral, and also contributed to the funding for the development of the Ronald Reagan Presidential Library. She was also a member of the elite charitable group The Colleagues, which funded homes for unmarried mothers and their children.

In 2007, curators Kevin Jones and Christina Johnson organized a show of 60 pieces from Bloomingdale at the Fashion Institute of Design and Merchandising. In 2009, Jones collaborated with Bloomingdale to present the 2009 "High Style: Betsy Bloomingdale and the Haute Couture" exhibition, which displayed 60 of her haute couture gowns.
