= Alfred S. Bloomingdale =

American businessman (1916–1982)

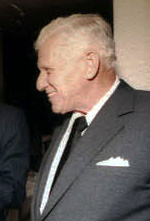
- Alfred Bloomingdale, 1981
- Born: Alfred Schiffer Bloomingdale; April 15, 1916; New York City, NY, U.S.
- Died: August 23, 1982 (aged 66); Santa Monica, California, U.S.
- Resting place: Holy Cross Cemetery
- Education: Brown University
- Known for: Father of the credit card
- Spouse: Betty Lee Newling (m. 1946)
- Children: 3
- Family: Lyman G. Bloomingdale (grandfather); Joseph B. Bloomingdale (great-uncle)

Alfred Schiffer Bloomingdale (April 15, 1916 – August 23, 1982) was an American businessman who launched the credit card business Dine and Sign, was chairman of Diners Club, and became known as "father of the credit card." He was an heir to the Bloomingdale's department store fortune and the lover of murdered mistress Vicki Morgan.

== Early life and education ==
Bloomingdale was born to a wealthy Jewish family on April 15, 1916, in New York City, the son of Rosalind (née Schiffer) and Hiram Bloomingdale, and the grandson of Lyman G. Bloomingdale, a co-founder of the famous department store Bloomingdale's. Bloomingdale attended Brown University in Providence, Rhode Island, where he was a member of the football team as well as Delta Kappa Epsilon fraternity (Upsilon chapter).

== Career ==
After school, he worked as a salesman at Bloomingdale's but after three years he left to work as a theatrical agent where he represented Frank Sinatra and Judy Garland. He tried his hand at producing Broadway shows and movies but was not very successful. In 1946, he moved to Los Angeles where he worked as an executive at Columbia Pictures. To facilitate the need of his wealthy friends who liked to patronize New York City's upscale restaurants following a night at the theater, Bloomingdale launched a credit card business called "Dine and Sign" that meant people on a night out no longer needed to carry large sums of cash. In 1951, he merged his company with Diners Club and joined the rapidly growing business as an executive, becoming chairman of the board of directors in 1964. In 1969, he left Diners Club, acquiring its "International Floatels" division.

== Personal life ==
In 1946, Bloomingdale married Betty Lee "Betsy" Newling, a practicing Roman Catholic, movie starlet and daughter of Dr. Russell Lee Newling (who was a Beverly Hills-based physician born in Adelaide, South Australia). Alfred and Betsy Bloomingdale had three children:

- Geoffrey Bloomingdale (born 1950), married to Elizabeth Fahr in 1972;
- Lisa Bloomingdale Bell (born 1951), married to R. McKim Bell in 1974; and
- Robert Russell Bloomingdale (born 1954), married to Justine Hayward Schmidt in 1979.

Bloomingdale and his wife Betsy were friends and confidantes of Ronald and Nancy Reagan. In 1981 Reagan, following his election to the U.S. presidency, appointed Bloomingdale to the President's Foreign Intelligence Advisory Board and the following year named him a member of the United States Advisory Commission on Public Diplomacy. Although born to a Jewish family, Bloomingdale became a Catholic to marry Betsy, and later became a member of the Knights of Malta. The Bloomingdales maintained homes in New York, the Holmby Hills section of Los Angeles, and an apartment in the Watergate Hotel in Washington, D.C.

=== Vicki Morgan affair ===
In 1970, while in Los Angeles, 54-year-old Alfred Bloomingdale began an affair with 18-year-old Vicki Morgan. For 12 years, Bloomingdale kept her in a luxurious apartment, showering her with expensive clothing, jewelry, and cars. When Alfred was diagnosed with terminal cancer, his wife Betsy cut off Morgan's allowance. Soon after, the affair with Vicki Morgan made headline news as its unsubstantiated and sordid details, which included allegations of sado-masochistic activities instigated by Bloomingdale, were made public after Morgan filed a multimillion-dollar palimony lawsuit against Bloomingdale's estate. Morgan eventually moved into a condominium in the San Fernando Valley where she rented a room to a schizophrenic named Marvin Pancoast, whom she knew from the withdrawal clinic. In July 1983, Pancoast beat her to death with a baseball bat. The courts awarded Morgan $200,000 after her death from Bloomingdale's estate.

=== Death ===
Alfred Bloomingdale died of throat cancer in 1982 in Santa Monica, California, aged 66. He is buried at Holy Cross Cemetery in Culver City, California.

=== Posthumous accusation of attempted rape ===
In 2017, actress Janis Paige wrote a guest column for The Hollywood Reporter in which she stated that Alfred Bloomingdale had attempted to rape her when she was 22 years old.
