= Wallerstein =

Wallerstein may refer to:

- Wallerstein, Bavaria, a town and castle near Nördlingen in Germany
- Codex Wallerstein, a 15th-century fechtbuch named for the Oettingen-Wallerstein library it once was part of.

== People ==
- House of Oettingen-Wallerstein, a cadet branch of the House of Oettingen-Oettingen created in 1423 and 1557
- Adelaide Wallerstein (1869–1942), American translator, medical doctor, lawyer and clubwoman
- Anton Wallerstein (1813–1892), German composer
- Immanuel Wallerstein (1930–2019), U.S. sociologist
- Jim Wallerstein (born 1968), guitarist and vocalist
- Judith Wallerstein, (1921–2012), psychologist
- Michael Wallerstein (1951–2006), political scientist
- Robert S. Wallerstein, (1921–2014), psychoanalyst

== See also ==
- Wallenstein (disambiguation)
- Walerstein, a surname
