= Joan Cullman =

American philanthropist and Broadway producer

- Born: Joan Paley; 1932; Far Rockaway, Queens, New York, US
- Died: March 18, 2004 (aged 72); Tryall, Jamaica
- Education: B.A. Brooklyn College
- Occupation: Philanthropist
- Known for: Broadway producer
- Spouse(s): Barnard Sachs Straus (divorced); Joseph F. Cullman III
- Children: 2
- Family: Nathan Straus Jr. (father-in-law)

Joan Paley Straus Cullman (1932–2004) was an American philanthropist and Tony Award Broadway producer.

== Biography ==
Born Joan Paley to a Jewish family in 1932 in Far Rockaway, Queens, she is a graduate of Brooklyn College. She has one brother, Leon Paley. After school, she worked for Stan Lee of comic book fame. She went on to produce nine Broadway shows including Yasmina Reza's Art, (1998) which won the Tony and New York Drama Critics Circle awards for best play; David Hare's Tony Award-nominated Skylight (1996); Tony-nominated Sweet Smell of Success (2002); Tony-nominated The Play What I Wrote (2004); The Rink, a musical written by Terrence McNally with music by John Kander and lyrics by Fred Ebb; David Hare's The Judas Kiss; Carmelina; Amy's View; Oh, Brother!; Mademoiselle Colombe; and Caroline, or Change.

Since 1985, Cullman served on the board of the Lincoln Center Theater and most recently as vice chairman; she founded the Joan Cullman Award for Extraordinary Creativity, which has been presented to the likes of Tom Stoppard, Stockard Channing, Julie Taymor, and Spalding Gray.

== Personal life ==
Paley was married twice. Her first marriage to Barnard Sachs Straus (son of Nathan Straus Jr. and grandson of Bernard Sachs) ended in divorce; they had two children, Tracy Straus Postel and Barnard S. Straus Jr. Her second marriage was to Joseph F. Cullman III. They divorced soon after marrying but moved back in together after several years and remarried in 1988. On March 18, 2004, she died of a heart attack at her vacation home in Tryall, Jamaica.
