= Joseph Cullman =

American businessman (1912–2004)

- Born: Joseph Frederick Cullman III; April 9, 1912; New York City
- Died: April 30, 2004 (age 92)
- Occupation: Businessman
- Known for: CEO of Philip Morris Company
- Spouse(s): Susan Lehman (divorced); Joan Paley Straus
- Children: Dorothy Cullman Treisman (with Lehman)
- Parent(s): Francis Nathan Wolff Cullman; Joseph F. Cullman Jr.
- Relatives: Dorothy Cullman (sister-in-law); Edgar M. Cullman (brother)

Joseph Frederick Cullman III (April 9, 1912 – April 30, 2004) was an American businessman who was CEO of Philip Morris from 1957 to 1978.

== Early life ==
Cullman was born to a Jewish family on April 9, 1912, in New York City, the son of Frances Nathan Wolff and Joseph F. Cullman Jr. He had two brothers Edgar M. Cullman and Lewis B. Cullman (married to Dorothy Freedman Cullman). He was educated at the Collegiate School (New York City) and the Hotchkiss School.

In 1929, Cullman's father purchased the Webster Tobacco Company after the 1929 stock market collapse where the younger Cullman worked during the summers while attending Yale University from which he graduated in 1935.

== Career ==
After college Cullman worked as a clerk in a local tobacco store and then worked at the Uppmann Cigar factory in Cuba. In 1941, his father and uncle, Howard S. Cullman, founded an investment company, Cullman Brothers Incorporated, to purchase Benson & Hedges. Cullman served during World War II and after the war, he went to work for Benson & Hedges as executive vice president until 1953. In 1954, Cullman brothers exchanged its interest in Benson & Hedges for $22.4 million in Philip Morris stock. Cullman was appointed a vice president at Philip Morris in 1954; executive vice president in 1955; president and CEO in 1957; and chairman of the board and CEO in 1967, a position he held until 1978.

During his tenure as CEO, the Philip Morris brand Marlboro became the most popular brand of cigarette in the United States. Described as "the cigarette industry's chief defender against the antitobacco movement", he oversaw the creation of the successful Marlboro Man campaign from the 1950s onwards which has since become known as an icon of American TV advertising. In a now notorious 1971 television interview on the American current affairs program Face the Nation, in response to a recently published study on the large numbers of undersized babies born to pregnant female smokers he declared "I concluded from that report that it's true that babies born from women who smoke are smaller, but they are just as healthy as the babies born to women who do not smoke. Some women would prefer having smaller babies."

== Personal life ==
In 1935, he married Susan Lehman, daughter of Harold M. Lehman and member of the Lehman family; they had one daughter, Dorothy Cullman Treisman, before divorcing in 1974. He then married Joan Paley Straus who had two children from a previous marriage, Tracy Straus and Barnard S. Straus Jr. They divorced soon after marrying but moved back in together after several years and remarried in 1988.

Away from the tobacco industry he had an interest in tennis. His company, Philip Morris, at the request of Gladys Heldman, sponsored the first Virginia Slims Women's Tennis Tour starting in 1970. He served as chairman of the US Open at Forest Hills in 1969 and 1970 and as both president and chairman of the International Tennis Hall of Fame from 1982 to 1988, into which he was inducted in 1990.

In 2002 Cullman donated an endowment to the Smithsonian Institution to establish the Joseph F. Cullman 3rd Library of Natural History rare book collection.
