= Tiparillo =

Shorter, thinner, and milder version of a cigar with a plastic tip

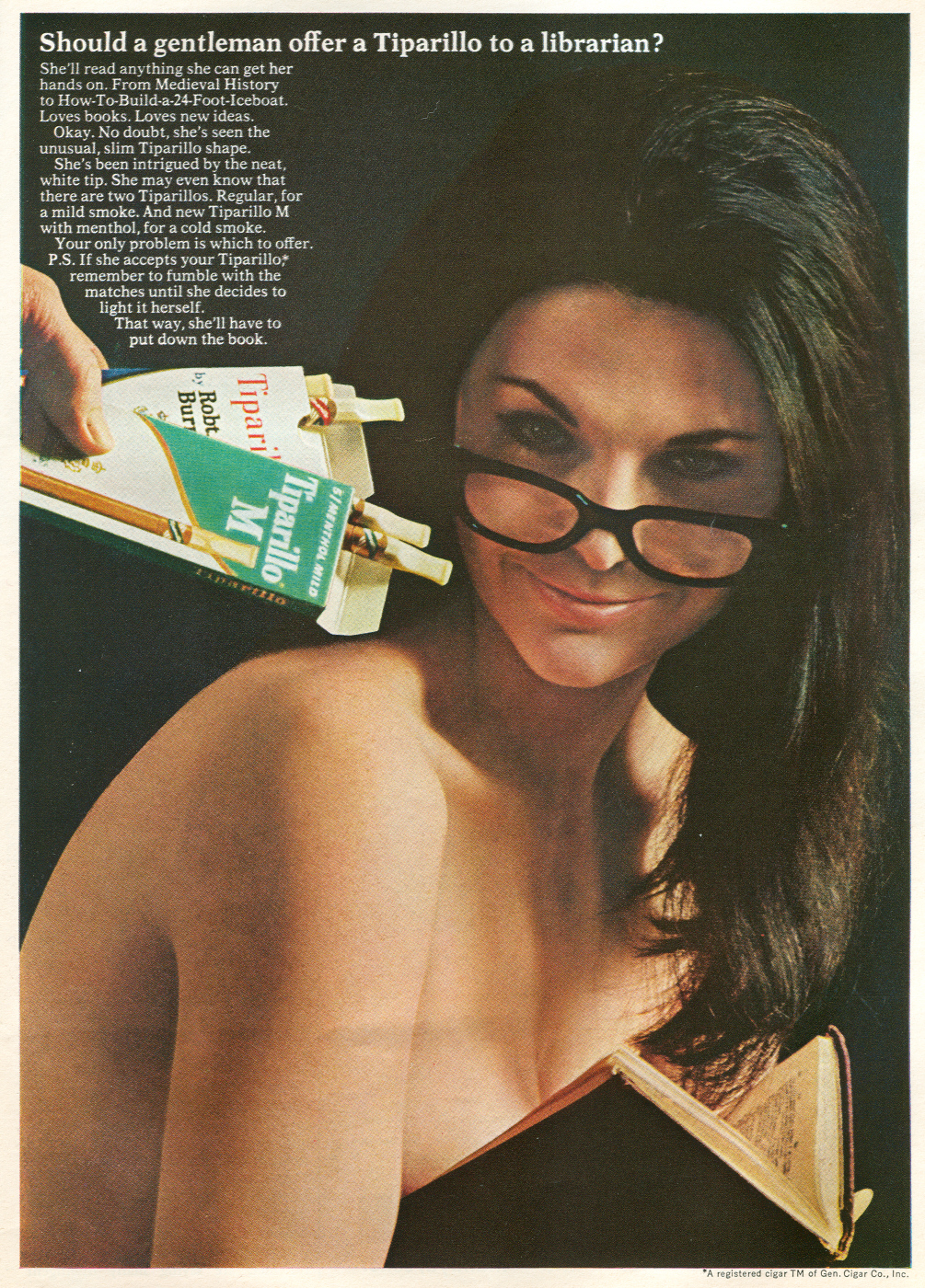
Tiparillo cigars as seen on an advertisement from 1967.

A Tiparillo is a shorter, thinner, and milder version of a cigar with a plastic tip. It is manufactured by the General Cigar Company. The name Tiparillo, a portmanteau of tip and cigarillo, was trademarked on July 3, 1961 by the Pinkerton Tobacco Company of Owensboro, Kentucky.

Postwar cigar makers sought to transform the image of their product to attract younger smokers and women who preferred cigarettes. The Tiparillo was developed in response to this desire.
