= Home for Hebrew Infants =

Orphanage

- Merged into: Jewish Child Care Association
- Formation: April 16, 1895; 131 years ago
- Location: Bronx, New York, U.S.
- Services: orphanage
- Formerly called: Hebrew Infant Asylum

The Home for Hebrew Infants was an orphanage, originally established at 149th Street and Mott Avenue in the Bronx on April 16, 1895, to care for Jewish babies from infancy to up to five years of age, those too young to be housed with older children. Its goal was to support the health of those in its care and prevent child mortality. By 1898, it had moved to 163rd Street and Eagle Avenue. In 1911, it had moved to Kingsbridge Road and Aqueduct Avenue.

Initially called the Hebrew Infant Asylum, the name was changed in 1916 so it would no longer be confused with the Hebrew Orphan Asylum.

A January 1918 advertisement by the Federation for the Support of Jewish Philanthropic Societies encouraged financial donations to support any of 84 institutions, including the Home, which was described as a child caring society caring for 386 infants per day.

Simon F Bleyer served as a director of the Home for 25 years and treasurer for 15 years. His death was the topic of a special meeting of the Home's directors on 8 June 1922 and memorialized in The New York Herald the following day.

The Home offered maternity training to expectant and prospective mothers.

The Home's new hospitalization building at West Kingbridge Road and University Avenue in the Bronx, New York, was dedicated on May 10, 1931. Aaron E Norman, President of the Home, was among the many speakers at the event.

In 1940, the Home for Hebrew Infants was merged with the Hebrew Orphan Asylum, the Jewish Children's Clearing Bureau, and Fellowship House to form the Jewish Child Care Association.
