= Lyman Bloomingdale =

American businessman

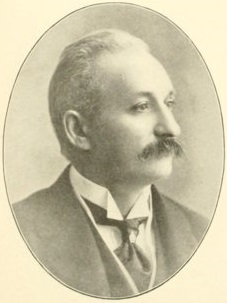
- Born: Lyman Gustave Bloomingdale; February 11, 1841; New York City, New York, US
- Died: October 13, 1905 (aged 64); Elberon, New Jersey, US
- Occupation: Retail businessman
- Known for: Co-founder of Bloomingdale's Department Store
- Spouse: Hattie Cullenberger
- Children: Hiram Bloomingdale; Samuel Bloomingdale; Irving Bloomingdale; Corinne Bloomingdale
- Parent(s): Hannah Weil; Benjamin Bloomingdale
- Family: Joseph B. Bloomingdale (brother); Emmanuel Watson Bloomingdale (brother)

Lyman Gustave Bloomingdale (February 11, 1841 – October 13, 1905) was an American businessman and philanthropist. He is best known for retail, and in April 1872, with his brother Joseph, founded department store chain Bloomingdale's Inc. on 59th Street in New York City.

== Early life and education ==
Lyman Bloomingdale was born on February 11, 1841, in New York City, the son of the Bavarian-born, German Jewish immigrant Benjamin Bloomingdale and Hannah Weil. Lyman and his brother Joseph were trained in the retailing of ladies clothing at their father's store. Lyman Bloomingdale was educated at various public schools in New York, and also attended Smith's Collegiate Institute. He served as a non-commissioned officer in the Kansas Volunteers in the Civil War.

== Career ==
Going into the retail business for themselves, on April 17, 1872, the Bloomingdale brothers opened their first store at 938 Third Avenue, New York City, between 56th and 57th Streets. With Lyman as the sole proprietor, the Bloomingdale brothers' new store sold a wide variety of European fashions, anchored through their own buying office in Paris. Their success resulted in the business outgrowing its premises and in 1886 they relocated operations to 59th Street and Third Avenue. His brother Joseph retired from the business on New Year's Day 1896, but Lyman remained involved until his death. By 1898, the first of Jesse W. Reno’s patented "inclined elevators" (early escalators) were incorporated into the Bloomingdale Bros. store at Third Avenue and 59th Street. This was the first retail application of the devices in the US, and no coincidence, considering that Reno's primary financier was Lyman Bloomingdale.

Involved in other business as well, Bloomingdale was president and director of the Walters Piano Company and Arcade Realty Company. Bloomingdale furthermore was a director for both the Vulcan Detinning Company and the Hudson Oil Company. In late August 1902, the newly formed Consolidated National Bank elected Bloomingdale as a director. He was a member of the Chamber of Commerce, as well as various civic institutions and the Lafayette Post. After his death in 1905, Lyman's sons Hiram and Samuel took over as heads of the department store. In 1929, Bloomingdale Brothers, Inc. was sold to the Federated Department Stores.

== Clubs and other memberships ==
He was a member of the Republican Club, the Harmonie Club, the Lotos Club, the National Arts Club, and others. He was a president of the Isaiah Lodge, Independent Order B'nai B'rith and of the Excelsior Lodge, Kesher Shel Barzel.

== Philanthropy ==
A benefactor to a variety of causes and cultural institutions, he was a long-term patron of the Metropolitan Museum of Art in New York, donating several notable works such as a Washington Allston painting in 1901. He was also a patron of young artists. In 1901 he was a founder of the Monteflore Home Country Sanitarium for Consumptives at Bedford Station in New York, and he focused much of his time and energy on the institution. He was a director and treasurer for the Monteflore Home for Chronic Invalids, and treasurer for Temple Beth-El. His will, written in 1904, left $100,000 (equivalent to $3.6 million in 2025) for charitable purposes.

== Personal life ==
Bloomingdale was married to Hattie Cullenberger in 1871. On April 17, 1872, the Bloomingdale brothers opened their first store at 938 Third Avenue, New York City, between 56 and 57 Streets, and Lyman and Hattie lived above the store. Their two eldest sons Samuel and Hiram were born in this residence, and in 1876 the family moved to larger quarters in a residence in Beekman Place. They had five children:

- Samuel Joseph Bloomingdale (1873–1968), married to Rita Goodman, 2 children
  - Susan Bloomingdale Ernst
  - Louise Bloomingdale Cullman (1919–2014), married to Edgar Cullman, Sr.
- Hiram Collenberger Bloomingdale (1875–1953), married to Rosalind C. Schiffer, 2 children;
  - Lyman Gustave Bloomingdale, married to Gwendolyn Ranger Wormser, 4 children;
    - Gwen Bloomingdale (died 2001 in plane crash off Iceland);
    - Penny Bloomingdale Baker;
    - Jennifer Bloomingdale Nelson
    - Billie Bloomingdale Logan
  - Alfred Schiffer Bloomingdale married to Betty Lee Newling, 3 children
    - Geoffrey Bloomingdale
    - Lisa Bloomingdale
    - Robert Bloomingdale
- Irving Ingersoll Bloomingdale (1878–1929) (married to Rosalie Banner)
- Corinne Bloomingdale Popper (1881–1940), married to Arthur W Popper, 2 children;
  - Edward Bloomingdale (born 1904)
  - Robert Lyman Bloomingdale (born 1908)
- Hannah Bloomingdale (1877–1891).

In the early morning of July 27, 1903, Wagner cottage in New York, owned by Lyman Bloomingdale, was destroyed by fire. Worth about $10,000 at the time, it had been unoccupied with the origin of the fire unknown. As of 1904, he had a residence at Third Avenue and 59th Street in New York. In September 1905, Bloomingdale sold a property on 355 East 155th Street, a four-story flat. Bloomingdale also had a residence at 730 Park Avenue in New York, with other former tenants including Mitzi Newhouse, Sam Newhouse, Edward M. Warburg, and John L. Loeb.

Bloomingdale died on October 13, 1905, at Elberon, New Jersey. The funeral was held on October 15 at Temple Beth-El. Hattie Bloomingdale died in 1941, at the age of 89 at her home at 570 Park Avenue.

== See also ==
- Esther Wallenstein
