= Bloomingdale's =

American luxury department store chain

Bloomingdale's Inc.

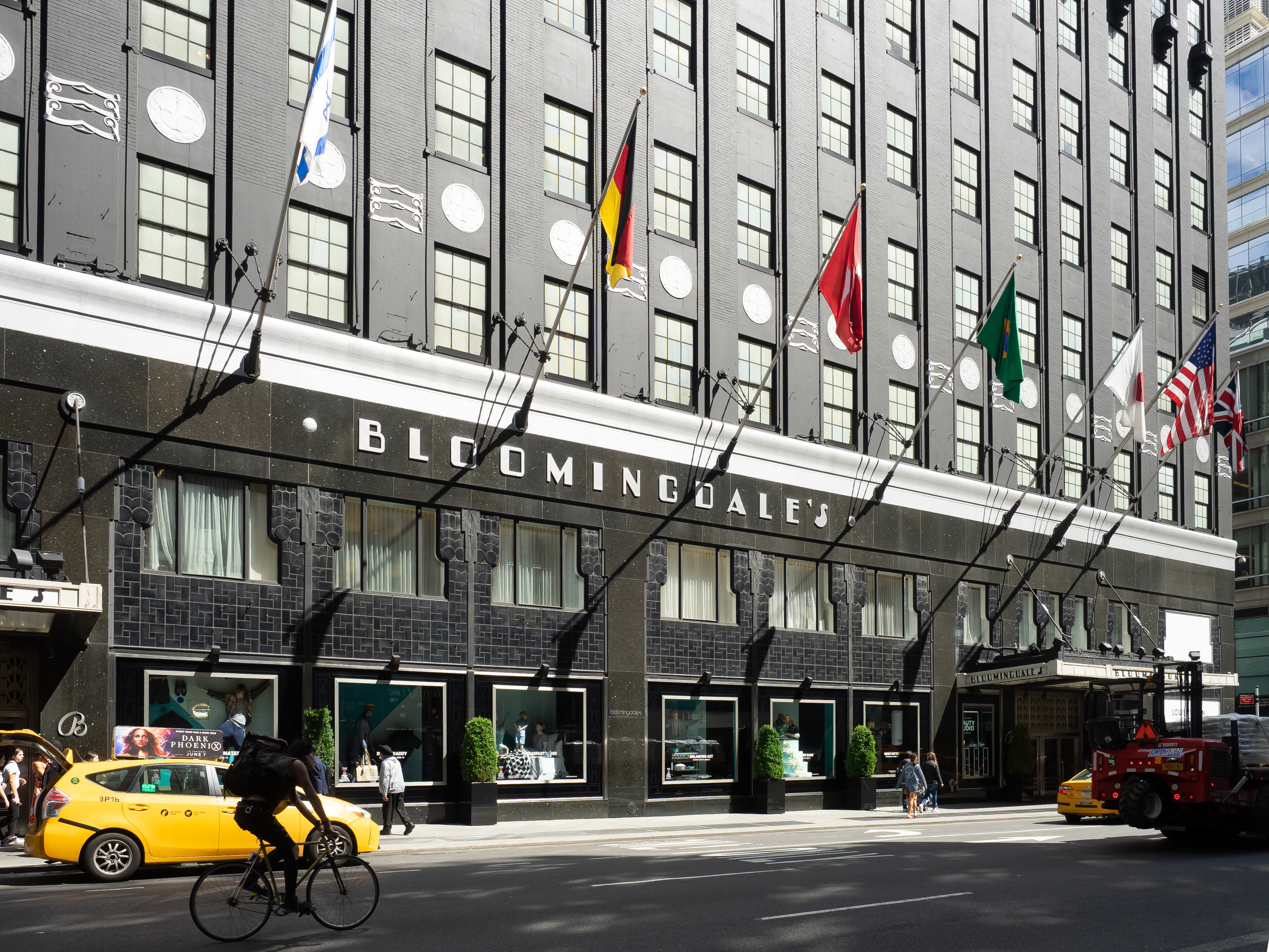
- Bloomingdale's flagship store in Midtown Manhattan in 2019
- Type: Subsidiary
- Industry: Retail
- Founded: 1861; 165 years ago
- Founders: Joseph B. Bloomingdale; Lyman G. Bloomingdale
- Headquarters: 59th Street and Lexington Avenue, New York City, U.S. 40°45′43″N 73°58′00″W
- Number of locations: 58 (Q3 2023)
- Area served: United States; United Arab Emirates; Kuwait
- Key people: Tony Spring (chairman and CEO)
- Products: Clothing; footwear; leather goods; jewelry; cosmetics; fragrances; bedding; bath; furniture; home decor; housewares; cafe
- Revenue: US$1.072 billion
- Parent: Macy's, Inc.
- Website: www.bloomingdales.com

Bloomingdale's Inc. is an upmarket American department store chain founded in 1861 by Joseph Bloomingdale and Lyman Bloomingdale. It was acquired by Federated Department Stores in 1930. Federated purchased Macy's department store chain in 1994 and was renamed Macy's, Inc. in 2007.

As of 2024, Bloomingdale's had a total of 32 directly-owned department stores, 21 outlet stores and 4 Bloomie's by Bloomingdale's concept stores. Nordstrom is its primary competitor. Internationally, Bloomingdale's has 3 franchised stores in Dubai and Kuwait.

Comparable sales rose 9% in the third quarter of 2025 — the strongest gain in 13 quarters. In 2025 and 2026, the company added brands including Chloé, Burberry, Casablanca, Bottega Veneta, Jacquemus, Khaite, Roger Vivier, Skims, and Zimmermann. Its headquarters and flagship store are located at 59th Street and Lexington Avenue in Manhattan, New York City. Its CEO is Olivier Bron.

== History ==
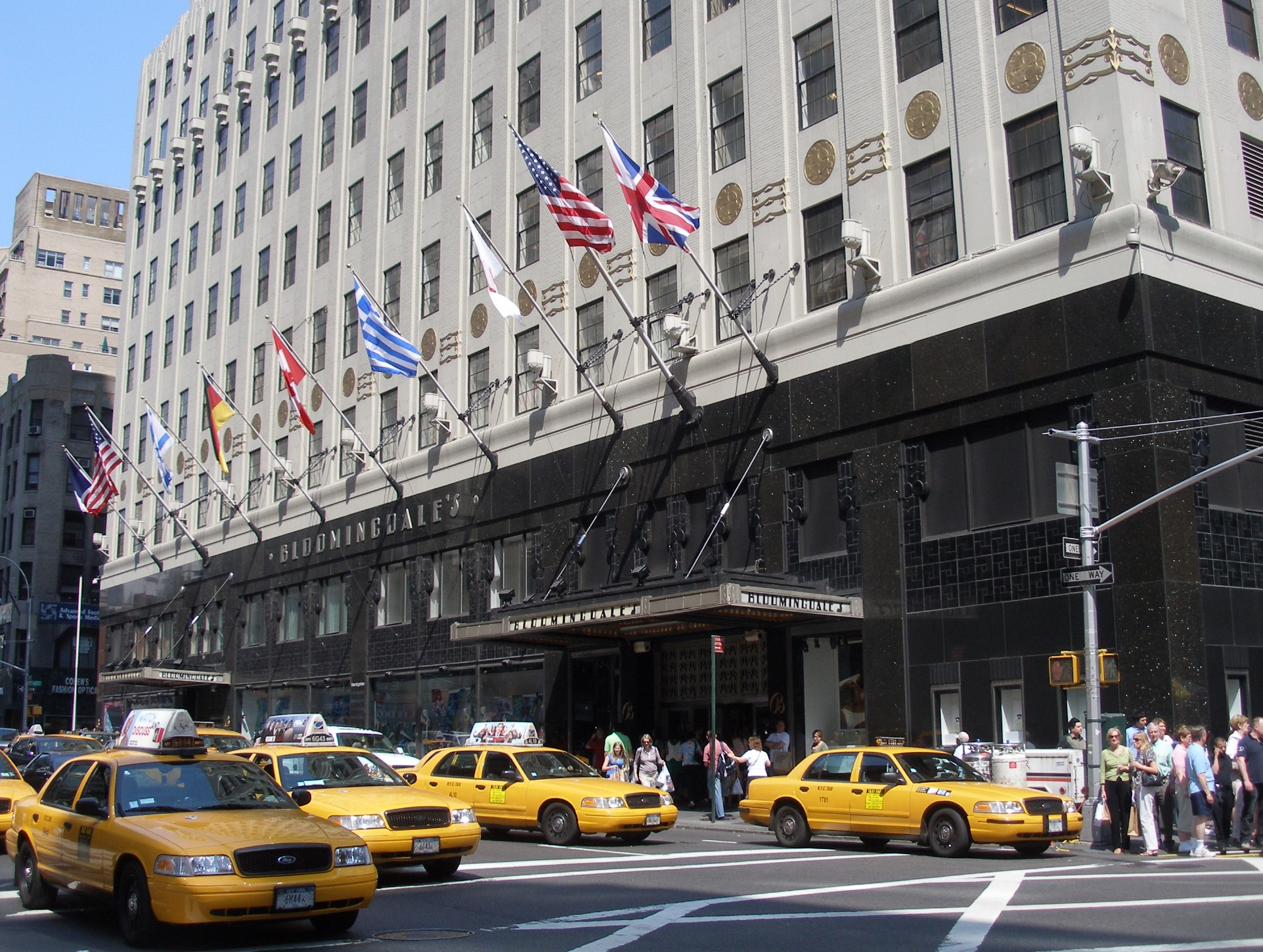
The historic Lexington Avenue flagship store in Midtown Manhattan

=== 19th century ===
==== Founding (1861) ====
The first Bloomingdale's was founded in New York City by Benjamin Bloomingdale and his son Lyman Bloomingdale in 1861 in its Lower East Side area, originally under the name Bloomingdale's Hoopskirts, initially focused on selling hoop skirts and European fashions. The brothers quickly identified opportunities for growth and expansion in the dynamic retail landscape of the time. In 1872, Lyman and his brother Joseph opened a second location called Bloomingdale's Great East Side Bazaar in Midtown Manhattan at 965 Third Avenue, between 56th & 57th Streets. The Bazaar later moved into three adjacent buildings further up the block before finally moving into a building at 59th St. and Third Avenue, where its flagship store remains today.

==== Relocations and expansion (1860s–1890s) ====
In the subsequent years, Bloomingdale's underwent a series of relocations and expansions. The brothers moved the store from its original location to a larger space on 59th Street and Third Avenue. As the business flourished, necessitating more significant retail space, the store moved once again to its iconic location at 59th Street and Lexington Avenue in 1886. This move marked a turning point, solidifying the store's position as a prominent retail destination.

In 1872, the store changed its name to "Bloomingdale's", reflecting the family name but also symbolized the flourishing and growth of their business.

Joseph Bloomingdale retired from the company in 1896, giving his brother Lyman full control, and Lyman's sons Hiram and Samuel inherited his shares upon his death in 1905.

=== 20th century ===
As the 20th century dawned, Bloomingdale's embraced innovative retail practices. The introduction of the department store window display in the late 19th century set a trend, making the store more visually appealing and attracting attention from passersby. This approach contributed to the store's reputation for being fashion-forward.

By 1902, the store grew to occupy 80 percent of the city block between 58th St. and 59th St. to the north and south, and Third Avenue and Lexington Avenue to the east and west.

After the New York City Subway debuted, the store's primary entrance was shifted to its Lexington Avenue side in 1918 to draw customers coming from the nearby IRT Lexington Avenue Line stop at 59th Street and Lexington Avenue. Given that the U.S. was involved in World War I, Samuel Bloomingdale gave the American Red Cross free use of an entire floor there until the war ended. By 1927, after acquiring all the remaining portions along it, Bloomingdale's controlled 100 percent of the block, expanding the store's size to 84,000 square feet (later nearly quadrupled via newly added floor space).

Like most publicly traded companies, Bloomingdale's faced severe financial problems following the Black Tuesday stock market crash in 1929, and it merged with the newly created Federated Department Stores in early 1930, which helped it survive the Great Depression.

==== 1945–1959: American designers and fashion influence ====
After World War II, Bloomingdale's played a crucial role in shaping post-war American fashion. The store actively engaged with European designers and trends, as well as promoting American designers, and was an influencer in fashion trends and the evolution of American fashion sensibilities. This period marked a phase of continued growth and influence for Bloomingdale's, solidifying its status as a premier department store. By the 1950s, Bloomingdale's had become an established and influential retail institution. The store's commitment to offering a wide range of high-quality merchandise and its role in shaping fashion trends laid the foundation for its continued growth and legacy in the decades to come.

==== First branch stores ====
In 1947, and tandem with America's economic boom after World War II, Bloomingdale's opened its first store outside of Manhattan in New Rochelle, a New York City suburb, where it assumed control of the former Ware's Department Store. After concluding that using pre-existing buildings could have been a better fit with its tried-and-true floor layouts, the company debuted its first custom-built store in 1949, located in the Fresh Meadows neighborhood across the East River in Queens. Over 25,000 people visited on its first day of business. A store in Stamford, Connecticut followed, and then in 1959, Bloomingdale's opened its store in Hackensack, New Jersey, along the banks of the Hackensack River. The store was designed by architect William T. Snaith of the firm Loewy Associates. In 1977, a mall now called The Shops at Riverside was constructed along the southern and eastern facades of the Bloomingdale's store, which was also enlarged.

==== 1960–1975 ====
During the 1960s, Bloomingdale's shifted its merchandise mix to incorporate haute couture fashions imported from Paris and home furnishings from Italy. It also launched its first single designer-specific department in 1969, for Halston, one that was quickly followed later that year by a dedicated Polo Ralph Lauren boutique in its men's store. By the early 1970s, Bloomingdale's had begun embracing avant-garde European design, and following the United Nations recognition of China in 1971, it became the first American retailer to sell products from Communist-era China. Its iconic rounded logo debuted in 1972, followed a year later by its "Big Brown Bag" and "Little Brown Bag," all of which remain in use today. Bloomingdale's continued to thrive throughout the 1970s, despite New York City's turbulence at the time, partly via continued expansions into the suburbs. Its largest branch opened in White Plains, New York in 1975, with 260,000 square feet of floor space, and shortly after that, Bloomingdale's shuttered its original, but much smaller, New Rochelle branch.

==== Expansion beyond New York area ====
In 1973, Bloomingdale's launched its first full-line department store outside of the New York City area in Chestnut Hill, Mass, followed by a store in McLean, Virginia, a suburb of Washington, D.C. in 1976. The First Lady at the time, Betty Ford, attended its opening as its guest of honor.

In 1979, Bloomingdale's hosted "Israel the Dream", an exhibition across seven floors of its flagship store in Manhattan. The exhibit about the State of Israel included Israeli products, art, silver, films, photography, sculpture, ancient archaeological artifacts, diamonds and synagogue models. The exhibition was in collaboration with the Israel Export Institute and the Government of Israel Trade Center. Yeshiva University and a number of Israeli museums and universities contributed items to the exhibition. Artworks by Nachum Gutman and Andy Warhol were shown, including the latter's portrait of Israeli Premier, Golda Meir.

In 1981, Bloomingdale's opened a branch at the King of Prussia Mall in suburban Philadelphia, then the largest mall in the world. Other new stores opened as well, along the East Coast, Florida, Chicago, and in Dallas, Texas. In 1988, Canadian real estate developer Robert Campeau launched a hostile takeover attempt of the company, successfully acquiring it for $6.6 billion: it was the largest non-oil corporate merger ever at the time.

==== Economic challenges (1990s) ====
Bloomingdale's faced continued economic challenges in the early 1990s, resulting in the closures of its Dallas, Fresh Meadows, and Stamford, Connecticut locations. In 1994, Federated Stores acquired the entire Macy's chain, which had been in bankruptcy for two years. In November 1996, Bloomingdale's expanded to California, converting four former stores of The Broadway. Bloomingdale's continued growth and shuttering of duplicative locations stemming from Macy's merger.

=== 21st century ===
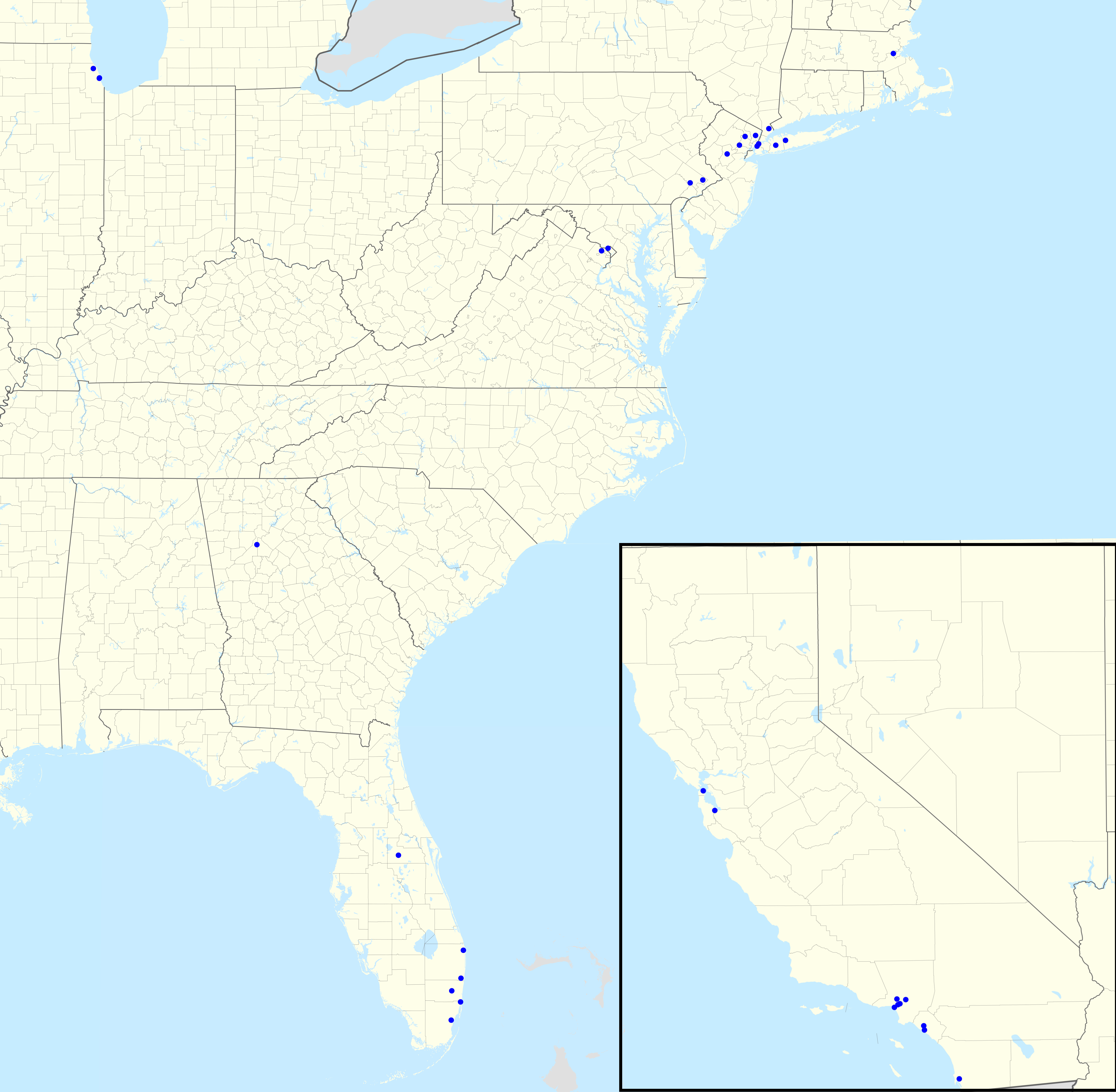
Map of Bloomingdale's locations as of October 2015

In 2004, the company returned once again to downtown Manhattan, opening an 82,000-square-foot store – featuring an "edited" selection of the flagship store's offerings – in SoHo.

In 2007, Bloomingdale's expanded into San Diego (Fashion Valley) and Costa Mesa (South Coast Plaza), once again by replacing former Robinsons-May stores that closed in 2006, in each case because there were already existing Macy's stores in each mall. In 2006, Bloomingdale's opened its largest store save its Manhattan flagship in San Francisco's Union Square, 330,000 sq ft (31,000 m^{2}) in area.

On June 1, 2007, Federated Stores changed its corporate name to Macy's, given its more robust name recognition, but left its Bloomingdale's store names intact.

On February 14, 2008, parent company Macy's, Inc. announced plans to enter the Phoenix market with a 180,000-square-foot store by 2009. Arizona would have been the thirteenth state to have a Bloomingdale's store location, with this store being the tenth in the western U.S. and 41st throughout the chain. This store never materialized as a result of the Great Recession in 2008 and 2009.

In May 2008, Bloomingdale's began the phase-out of its Bloomingdale's By Mail catalog to greater emphasize its rapidly growing online presence at bloomingdales.com. On September 10, 2008, Macy's announced plans to open three new Bloomingdale's stores, two modeled after its SoHo store. One was intended to be a three-level 82,000-square-foot (7,600 m^{2}) anchor store at The Shops at Georgetown Park in Washington, D.C., but the plan collapsed after the mall's parent company declared bankruptcy. The other two stores were completed, including a new 150,000 sq ft (14,000 m^{2}) branch at Westfield Valley Fair in San Jose, California, and a 205,000 sq ft (19,000 m^{2}) store in Santa Monica Place, in Santa Monica, CA. The latter debuted in early 2010. San Jose's debut was delayed until 2020, primarily due to the Great Recession, and Santa Monica closed in 2021 due to subpar performance.

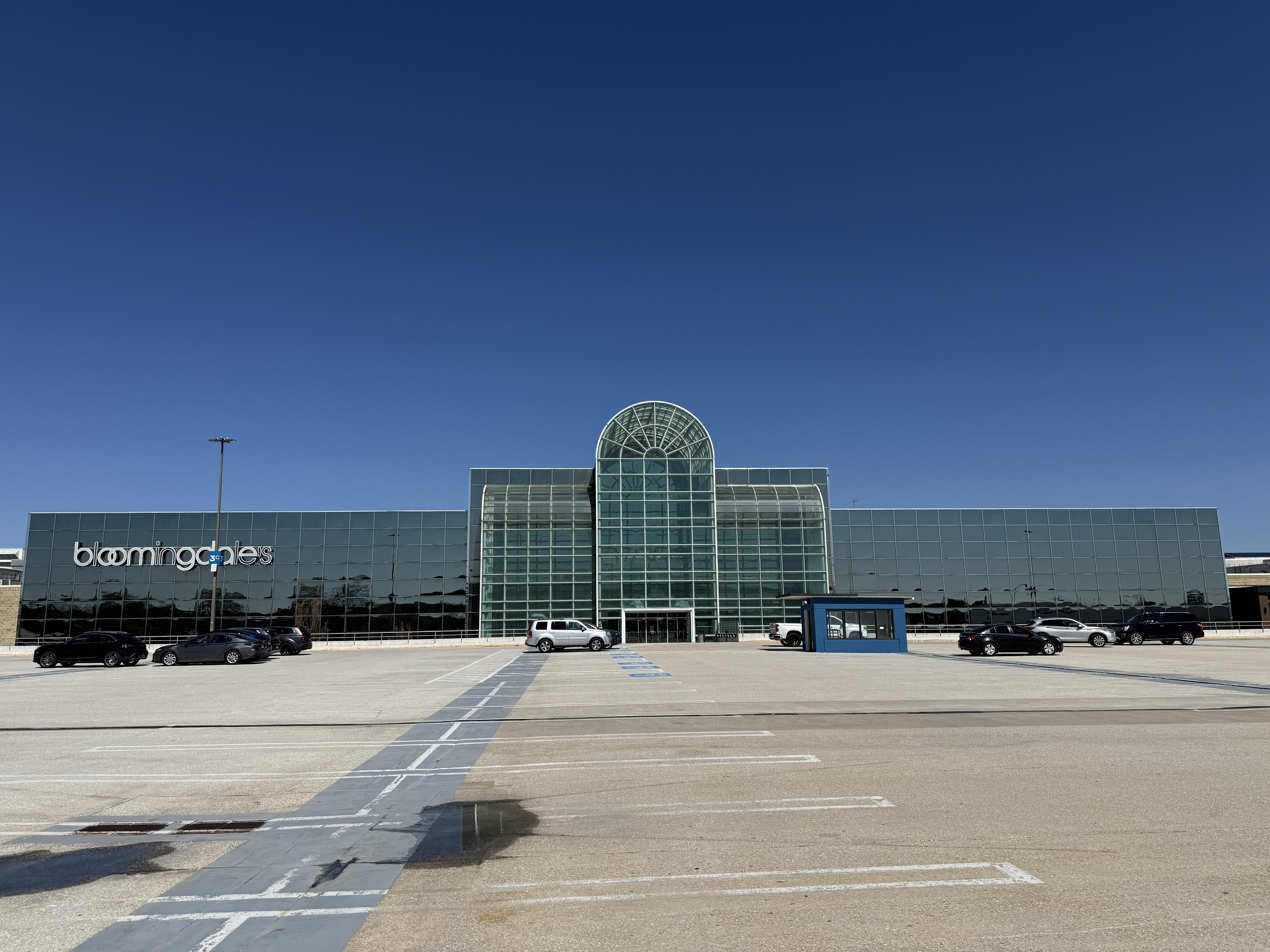
Bloomingdale's at the King of Prussia Mall in King of Prussia, Pennsylvania

In February 2010, Macy's launched Bloomingdale's first international location in Dubai. As is the case for rival Saks Fifth Avenue, the global presence for Bloomingdale's is operated under license by a local interest: in this case, Al Tayer Group LLC, a leading UAE-based conglomerate. Bloomingdale's CEO announced that the Dubai store would most likely be the only store outside of the U.S. (The company's leaders later had a change of heart, and opened a branch in Kuwait in 2017.) Later in 2010, the company launched its first outlet store at Potomac Mills, located outside of Washington, D.C.

In 2012, Macy's Inc. closed four Bloomingdale's stores: Minneapolis (Mall of America), Atlanta (Perimeter Mall), metro Washington DC area (White Flint Mall), and Chicagoland area (Oakbrook Center) areas.

In late 2019, Macy's announced that fur would no longer be sold in any of its stores, including Bloomingdale's department & outlet stores, as of the end of the 2020 fiscal year.

As part of an initiative to better establish its New York flagship store as a "retail destination," designed to allure shoppers who primarily purchase department store goods online, Bloomingdale's introduced new departments and offerings throughout the decade, including a branch of Magnolia Bakery and a boutique for Sarah Jessica Parker's SJC Collection shoe line. It was the first department store in New York to offer the latter. In 2018 and 2019, Bloomingdale's remodeled nearly 200,000 square feet inside the store, wholly revamping its denim, cosmetics, shoes, and women's contemporary clothing departments.

In March 2020, Macy's, Inc. announced that it would temporarily close all Bloomingdale's and Macy's locations as a result of the rapidly spreading COVID-19 pandemic. Its original plan to reopen at the end of March quickly evaporated due to the pandemic's rapid spread, as did its intent to do so by the end of April 2020: as was the case with most brick-and-mortar retailers, Macy's ended up closing some of its stores for a year or more, with reopening days that varied depending on their locations. Some did not reopen until late 2021.

On September 9, 2022, Bloomingdale's celebrated its 150th anniversary, featuring a variety of special events and unique merchandise offerings through the end of the year at its Manhattan flagship location.

== Timeline of department store openings ==
Year opened/ closed		#	Mall or district	City	Metro Area	State (US) or country	Gross floor area (sq ft)	Type	Remarks
1886	open	1	59th Street	New York	New York	New York	850,000	L	
1947	1977		554 Main Street	New Rochelle	New York	New York	110,000		Building was previously Ware's Dept. Store. Closed in 1977 after nearby White Plains store opened in 1975. Functioned for a time afterwards as a furniture outlet.
1949	1991		Fresh Meadows	Queens	New York	New York	149,000		At opening, 106,325 sq.ft., did not sell furniture or large appliances. Two stories plus basement. Architects Voorhees, Walker, Foley and Smith. Town-and-country suburban architectural theme, grey brick, white marble.
1954	1990		Stamford	Stamford	New York	Connecticut			The only Bloomingdale's in Connecticut in its 36 years.
1959	open	5	Shops at Riverside	Hackensack	New York	New Jersey	292,000	O	
1967	open	6	Short Hills	Short Hills	New York	New Jersey	246,000	GL	Opened on September 15
1971	1982		Manhasset furniture store	Manhasset, L.I.	New York	New York			Closed after the opening of nearby store in Garden City
1971	1982		Eastchester furniture store	Eastchester	New York	New York			Closed after the opening of nearby store in White Plains
1973	open	11	Mall at Chestnut Hill Home/Men's	Chestnut Hill	Boston	Massachusetts	124,000	O	
1975	open	12	White Plains	White Plains	New York	New York	296,000	O	Opened on September 16 with four levels.
1976	open	14	Tysons Corner Center	McLean	Washington DC	Virginia	268,000	L	
1977	2012		White Flint Mall	North Bethesda	Washington DC	Maryland	259,000		
1981	open	16	King of Prussia Mall	King of Prussia	Philadelphia	Pennsylvania	250,000	O	Opened on August 2 as Bloomingdale's first full-line store in the Philadelphia market.
1982	open	17	Willow Grove Park Mall	Willow Grove	Philadelphia	Pennsylvania	239,000	O	Opened on August 4 before the shopping mall itself.
1983	1990		Valley View Center	Dallas	Dallas–Ft. Worth	Texas	220,378		Closed due to subpar performance.
1986	open	2	Town Center at Boca Raton	Boca Raton	Miami-FtL-WPB	Florida	270,000	O	Opened on October 29 with a mall expansion.
1988	open	8	900 North Michigan	Chicago	Chicago	Illinois	270,000	L	Opened on September 24.
1992	2012		Mall of America	Bloomington	Minneapolis–St. Paul	Minnesota	233,000	L	
1994	2022		Old Orchard Shopping Center	Skokie	Chicago	Illinois			
1995	open	27	Roosevelt Field	Garden City	New York	New York	314,000	L	Opened on November 3. The only Bloomingdale's to open in the space of a former A&S store.
1996	open	28	Century City	Los Angeles	Los Angeles	California	232,000	L	Opened on November 9 in the space of a former The Broadway store as the first Bloomingdale's location in Southern California.
1996	open	30	Fashion Island	Newport Beach	Orange County	California	172,000	GL	Opened on November 14 in the space of a former The Broadway store.
1996	open	29	Sherman Oaks	Sherman Oaks	Los Angeles	California	228,000	O	Opened on November 16 in the space of a former The Broadway store.
1997	open	30	Fashion Island Home	Newport Beach	Orange County	California	68,000	L	Opened in March.
1997	open	32	Beverly Center	Los Angeles	Los Angeles	California	163,000	L	Opened in March in the space of a former The Broadway store.
1997	open	3	Aventura Mall	Aventura	Miami-FtL-WPB	Florida	252,000	GL	Opened on November 8.
1998	open	4	Walt Whitman Mall	Huntington Station	New York	New York	231,000	L	Opened in the former original space of Macy's who had two locations in the mall for some time in 1995 due to the A&S store being renamed.
2002	2013		Fashion Show Mall Home Store	Las Vegas	Las Vegas	Nevada			Closed with five other stores (all Macy's locations).
2002	open	24	Bridgewater Commons	Bridgewater	New York	New Jersey	161,000	L	Opened on April 13 in the space of a former Stern's store.
2002	open	20	Mall at Millenia	Orlando	Orlando	Florida	236,000	O	Original anchor store
2002	open	37	Willowbrook	Wayne	New York	New Jersey	255,000	O	Opened on April 13 in the space of a former Stern's store.
2003	2012		Oakbrook Center Home Store	Oak Brook	Chicago	Illinois	93,000		
2003	2012		Perimeter Mall	Dunwoody	Atlanta	Georgia	234,000		On January 4, 2012, Macy's announced it would close these four Bloomingdale's stores. Closed due to subpar performance.
2003	2020		Medinah Temple	Chicago	Chicago	Illinois			Home and Furniture Store in a historic building in the Near North Side, Chicago. June 2019 sold building to Chicago developer Al Friedman. Vacated September 2020.
2003	open	55	Lenox Square	Atlanta	Atlanta	Georgia	281,000	L	Opened in the space of a former Macy's store.
2004	open	53	Soho	New York	New York	New York	121,000	L	
2006	open	61	Fashion Valley	San Diego	San Diego–Tijuana	California	225,000	GL	
2006	open	11	Mall at Chestnut Hill Women's	Chestnut Hill	Boston	Massachusetts	186,000	O	
2006	2025	22	San Francisco Centre	San Francisco	San Francisco Bay Area	California	335,000	O	
2007	open	62	South Coast Plaza	Costa Mesa	Los Angeles	California	291,000	O	
2007	open	34	Wisconsin Place	Chevy Chase	Washington DC	Maryland	190,000	O	
2010	2021		Santa Monica Place	Santa Monica	Los Angeles	California	205,000		Closed due to subpar performance
2010	open	n/a	Dubai Mall	Dubai	Dubai	UAE	146,000	F	Main store
2010	open	n/a	Dubai Mall	Dubai	Dubai	UAE	54,000	F	Home store
2013	open	60	Glendale Galleria	Glendale	Los Angeles	California	112,000	L	Opened as part of the mall's remodel, replacing Mervyn's.
2014	open	31	Stanford Shopping Center	Palo Alto	San Francisco Bay Area	California	124,000	GL	
2015	open	58	Ala Moana Center	Honolulu	Honolulu	Hawaiʻi	164,000	L	On November 12, 2015, Bloomingdale's opened its first store in Hawaii. The three-story store replaced a former Sears and includes special services such as smart fitting rooms, charging lounges, and a 40 Carrots restaurant.
2017	open	n/a	360 Mall	Al Zahra	Kuwait.	Kuwait	93,000	F	
2019	open	46	SoNo Collection	Norwalk	New York	Connecticut	153,000	L	
2020	open	50	Samanea Mall	Westbury	New York	New York	25,000	L	
2020	open	57	Valley Fair	San Jose	San Francisco Bay Area	California	144,000	O	

Notes to table

This may be a partial list.

Store type:

- F = Franchise of Dubai-based Al Tayer Insignia
- GL = Ground Lease – Represents store properties where Macy's was involved with the construction of the building on leased land. Macy's Inc. generally has all of the attributes of ownership of these properties for the term of the lease.
- L = Leased – Represents store properties where Macy's Inc. leases the building and land.
- O = Owned – Represents store properties where Macy's Inc. owns the building and land. May also include a small amount of leased premises, such as additional space, kiosk or small shop real estate.

== Gallery ==
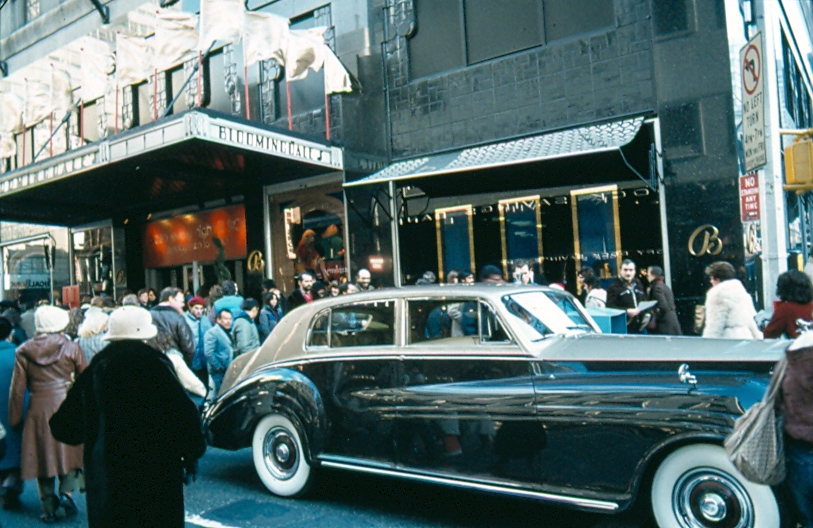
Close-up of flagship store entrance in 1981

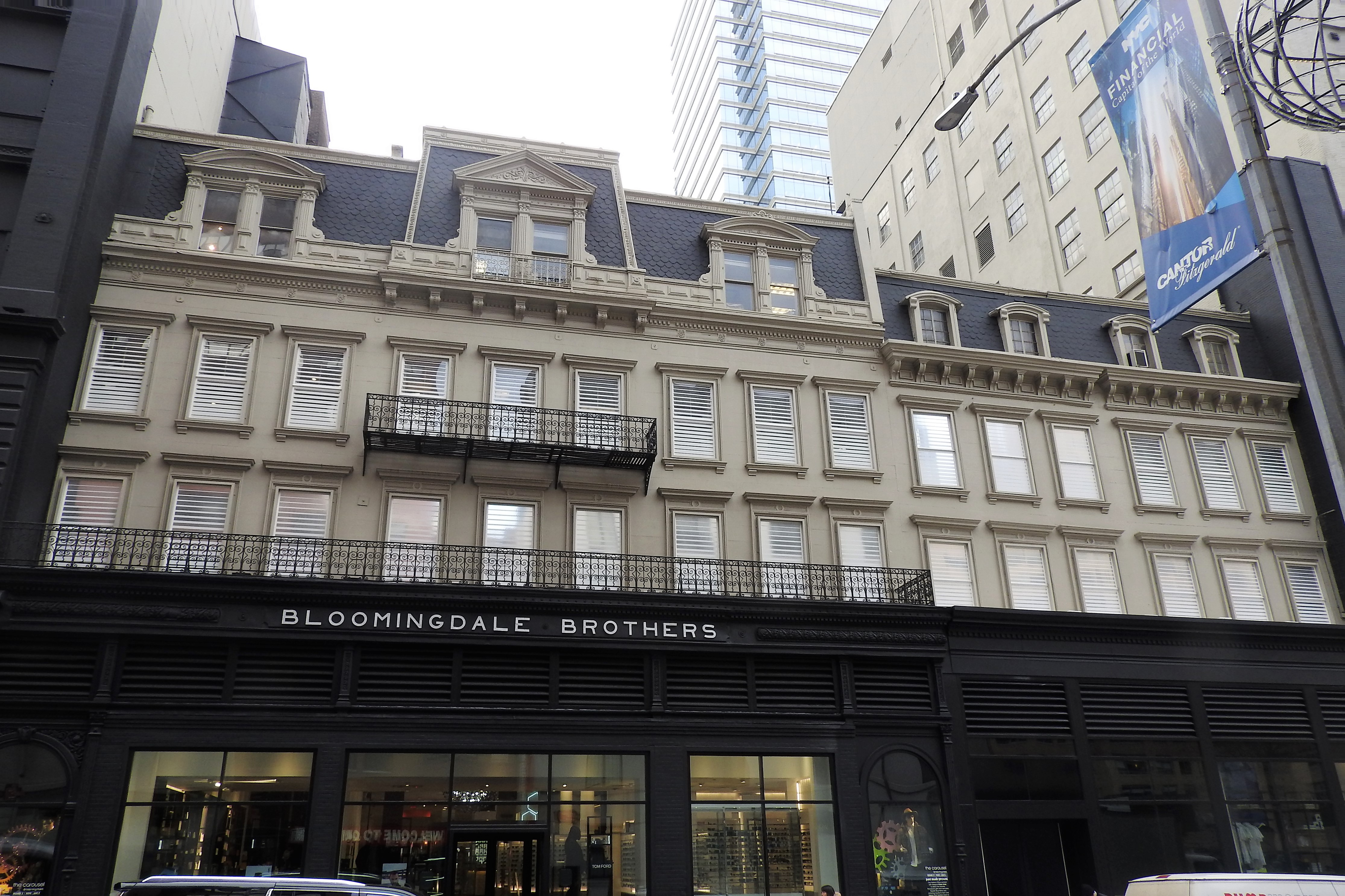
East 60th St entrance, New York flagship

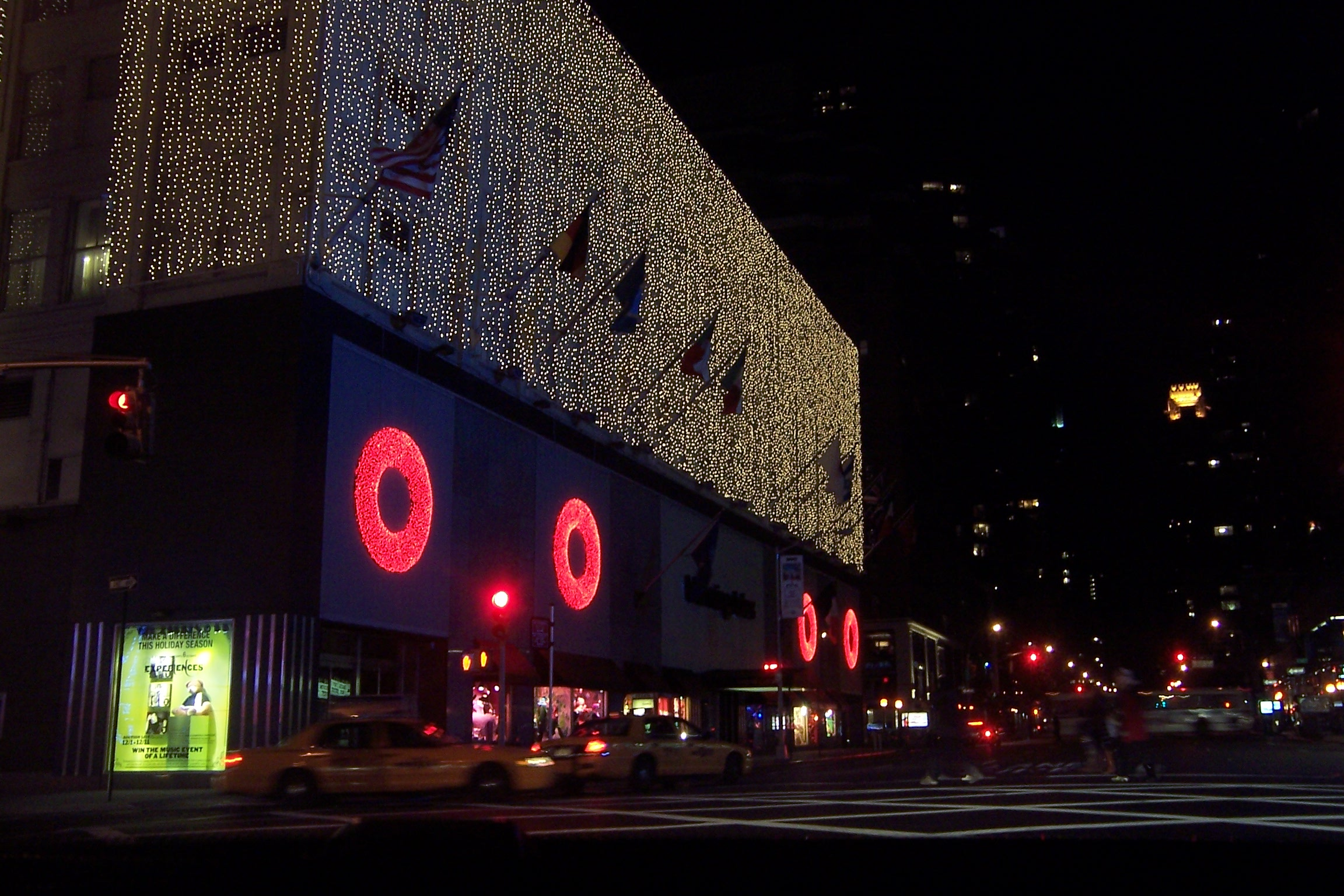
Flagship store during the Christmas season at night

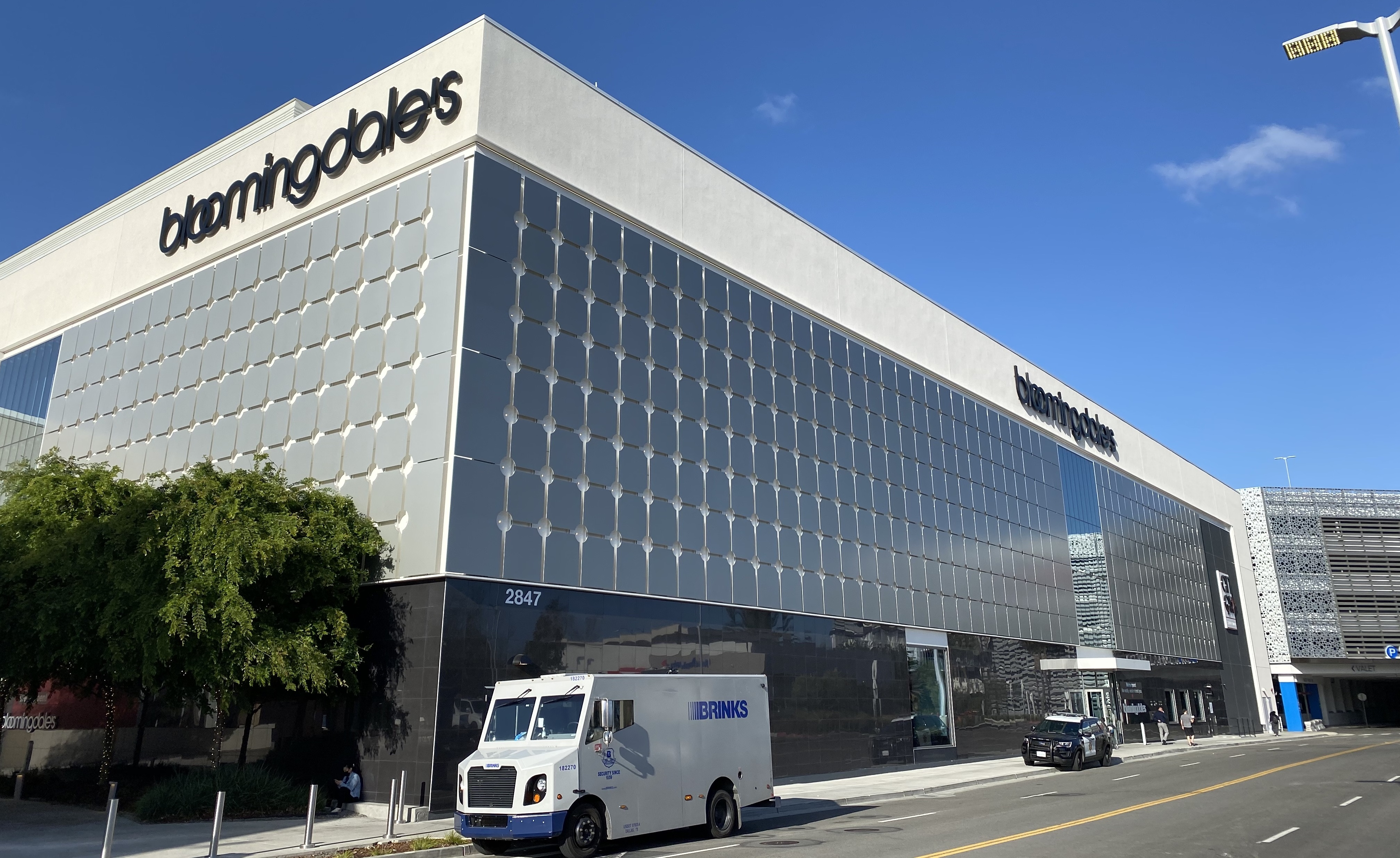
Westfield Valley Fair in San Jose

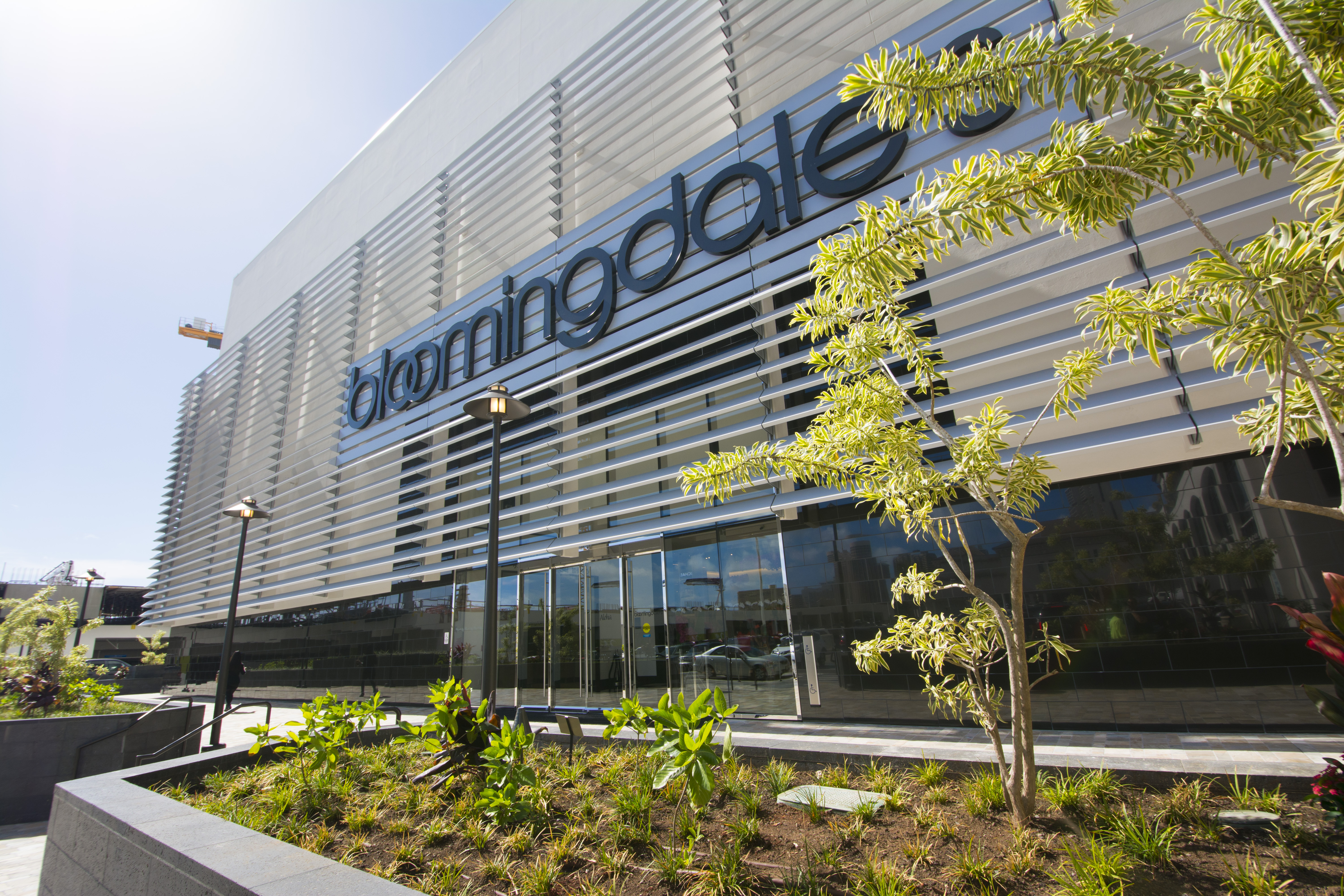
Ala Moana Center in Honolulu

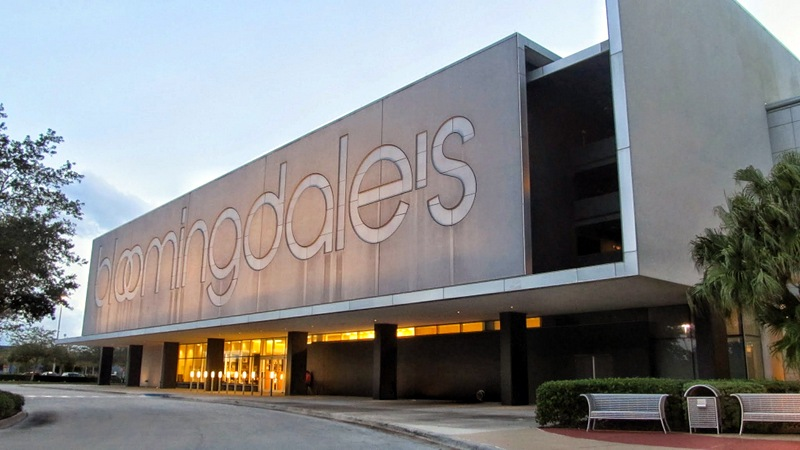
The Mall at Millenia, Orlando, Florida

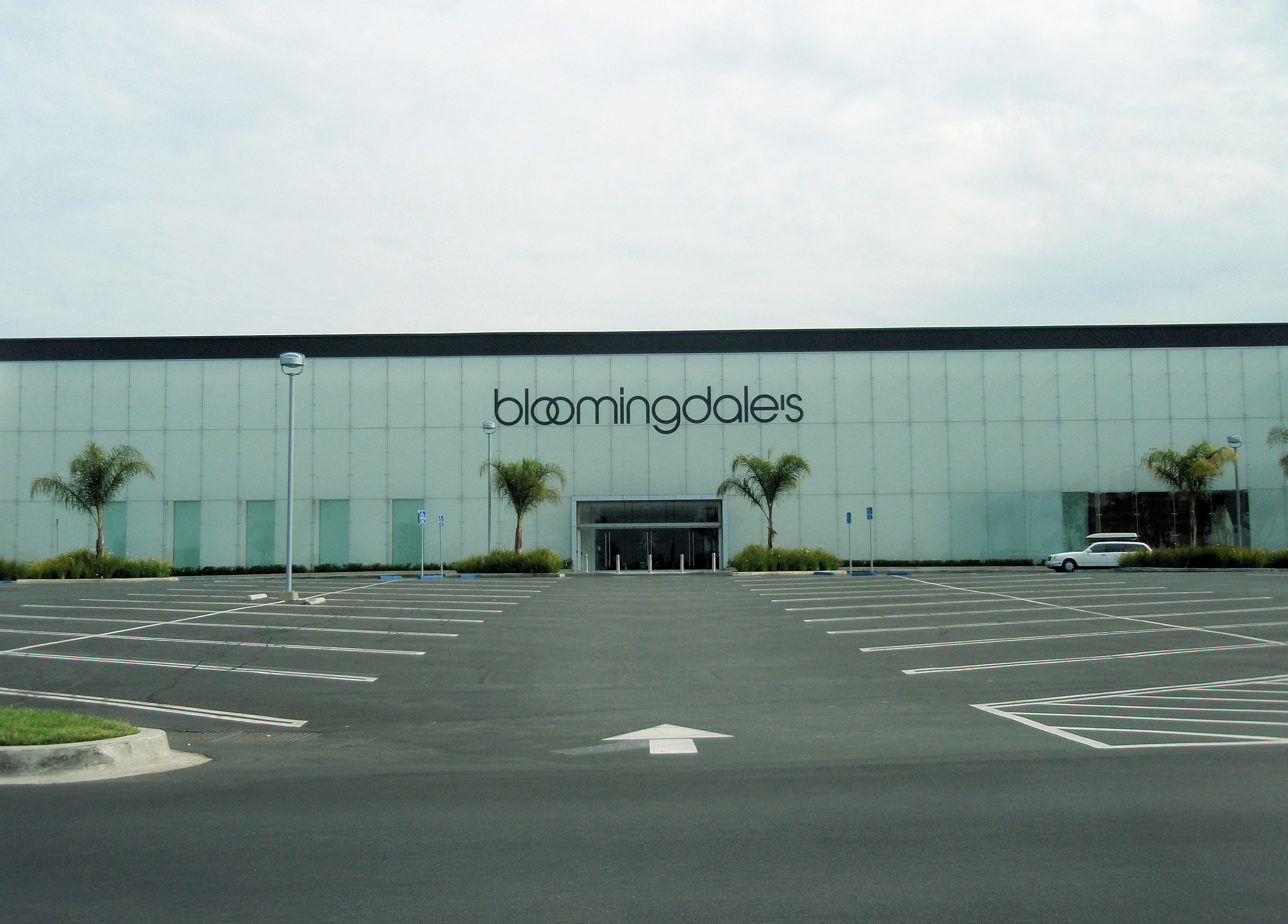
South Coast Plaza, Costa Mesa, California

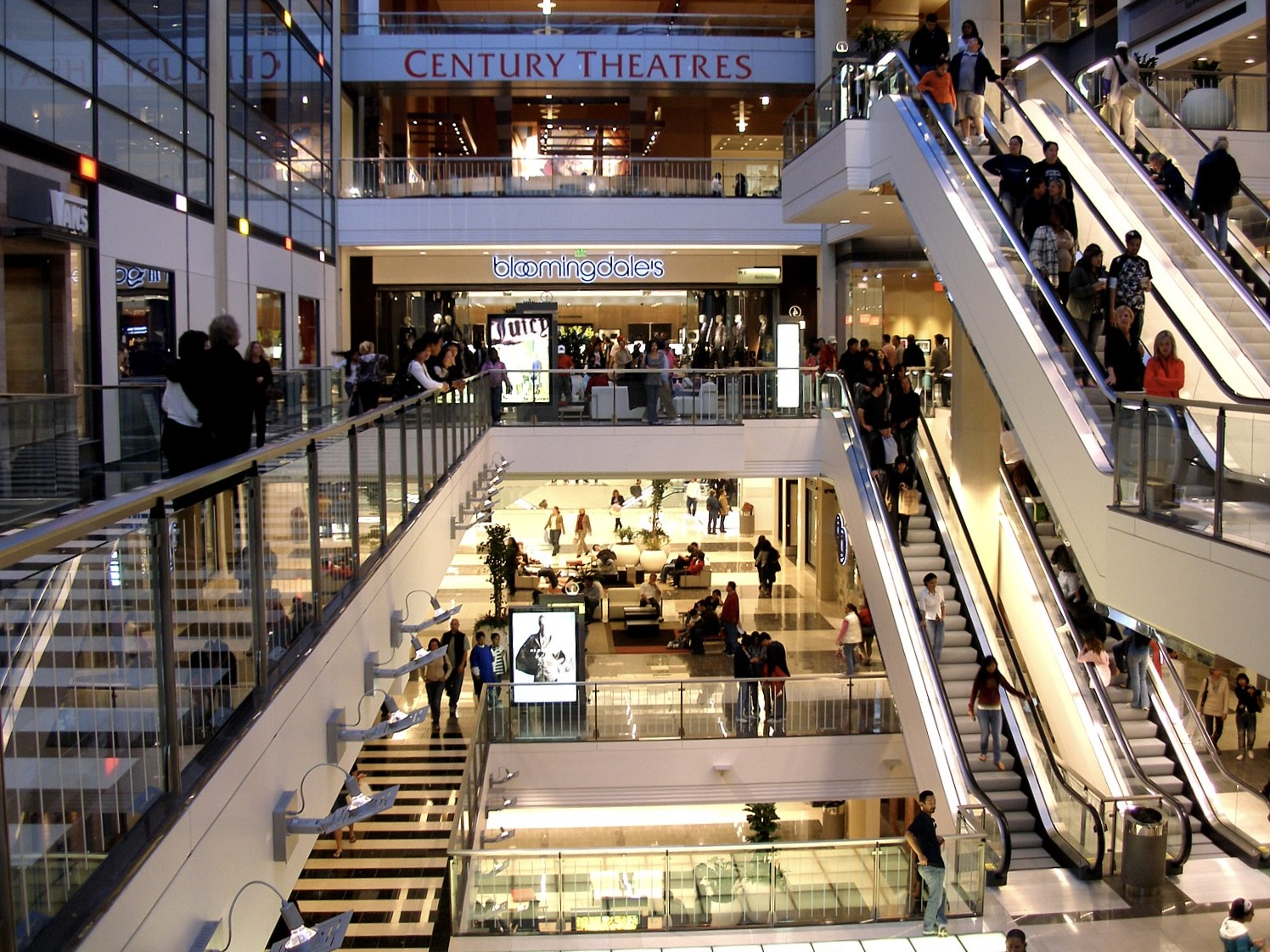
San Francisco Center

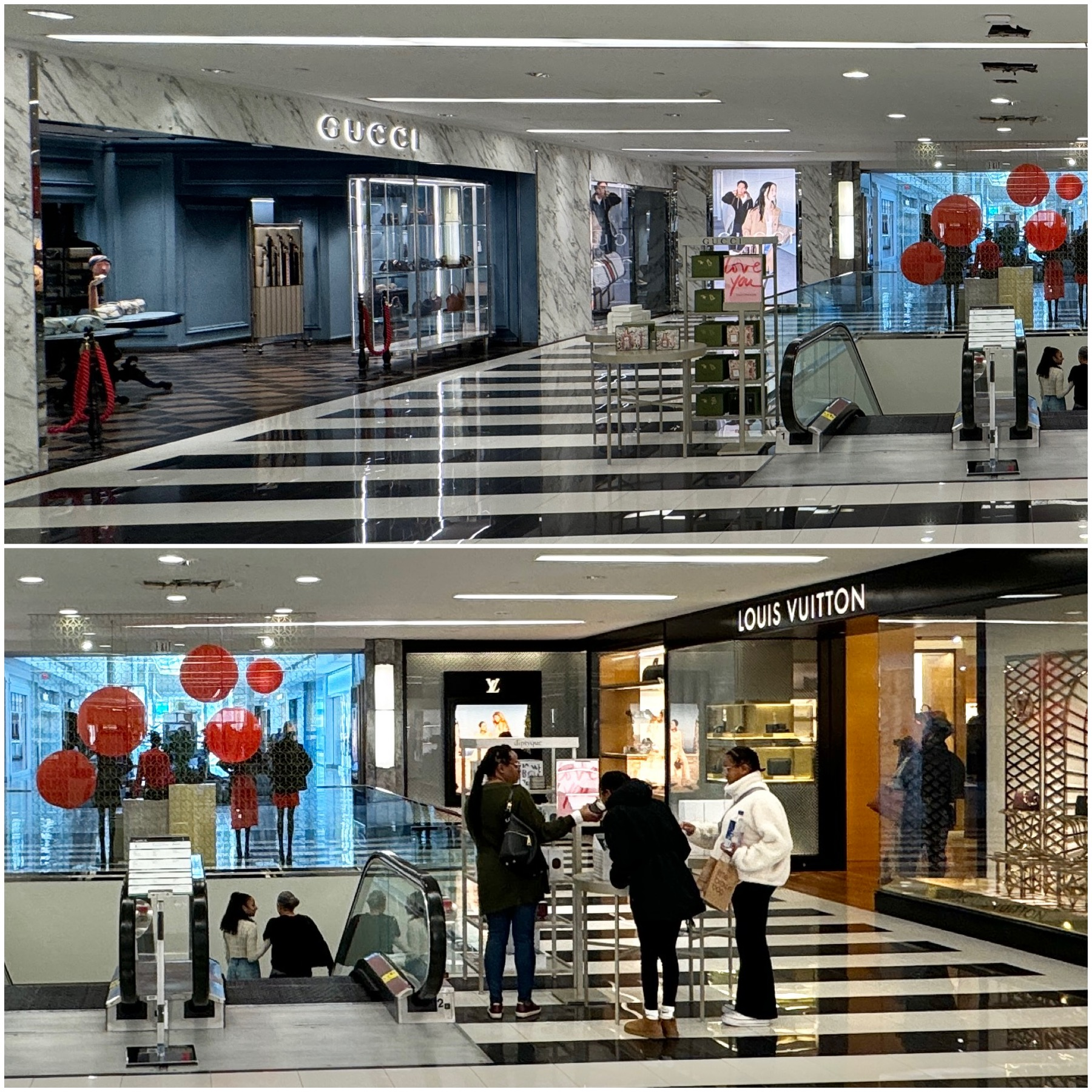
Stores-in-store at Tysons, Washington DC area

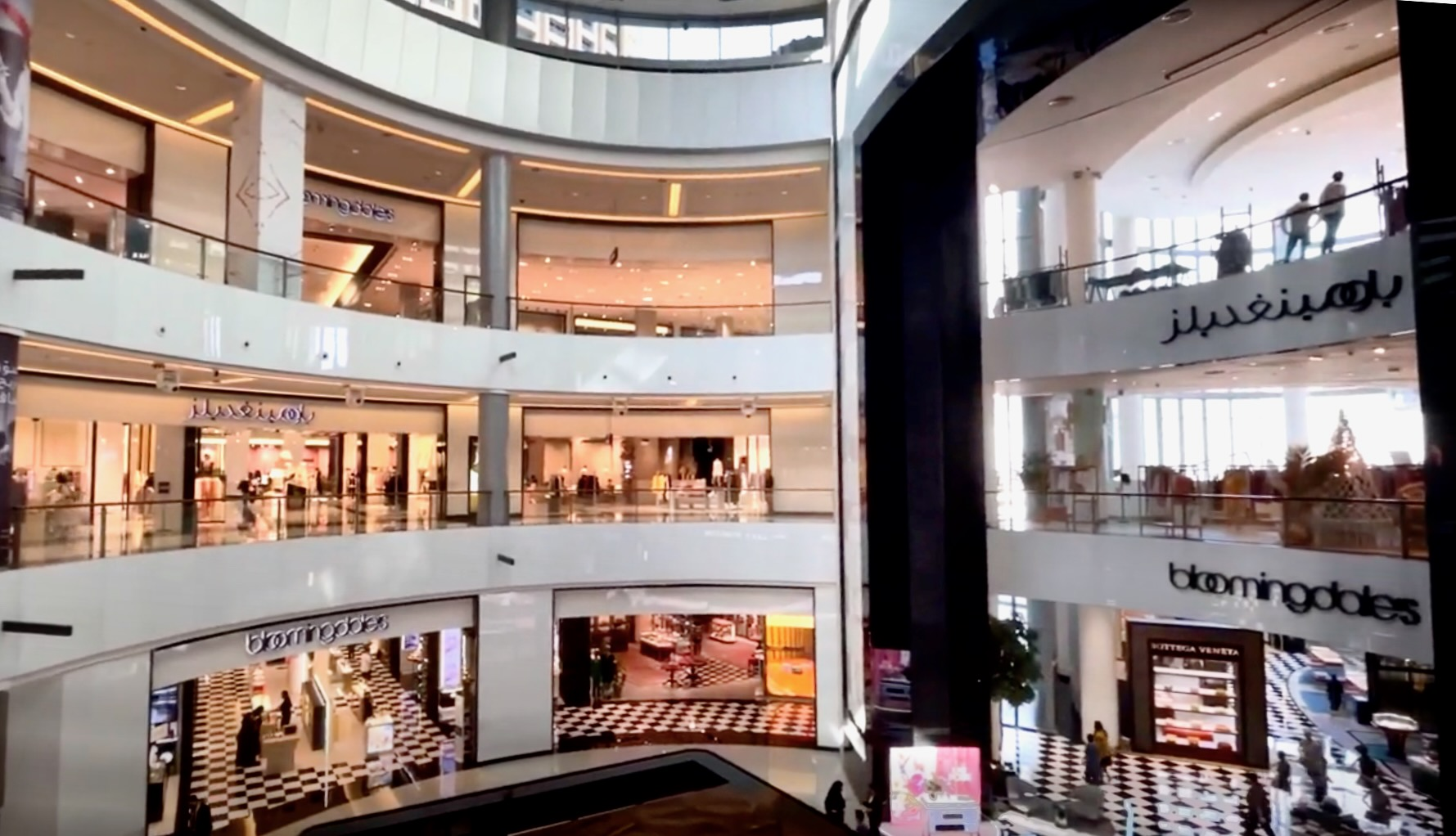
Dubai Mall, U.A.E.

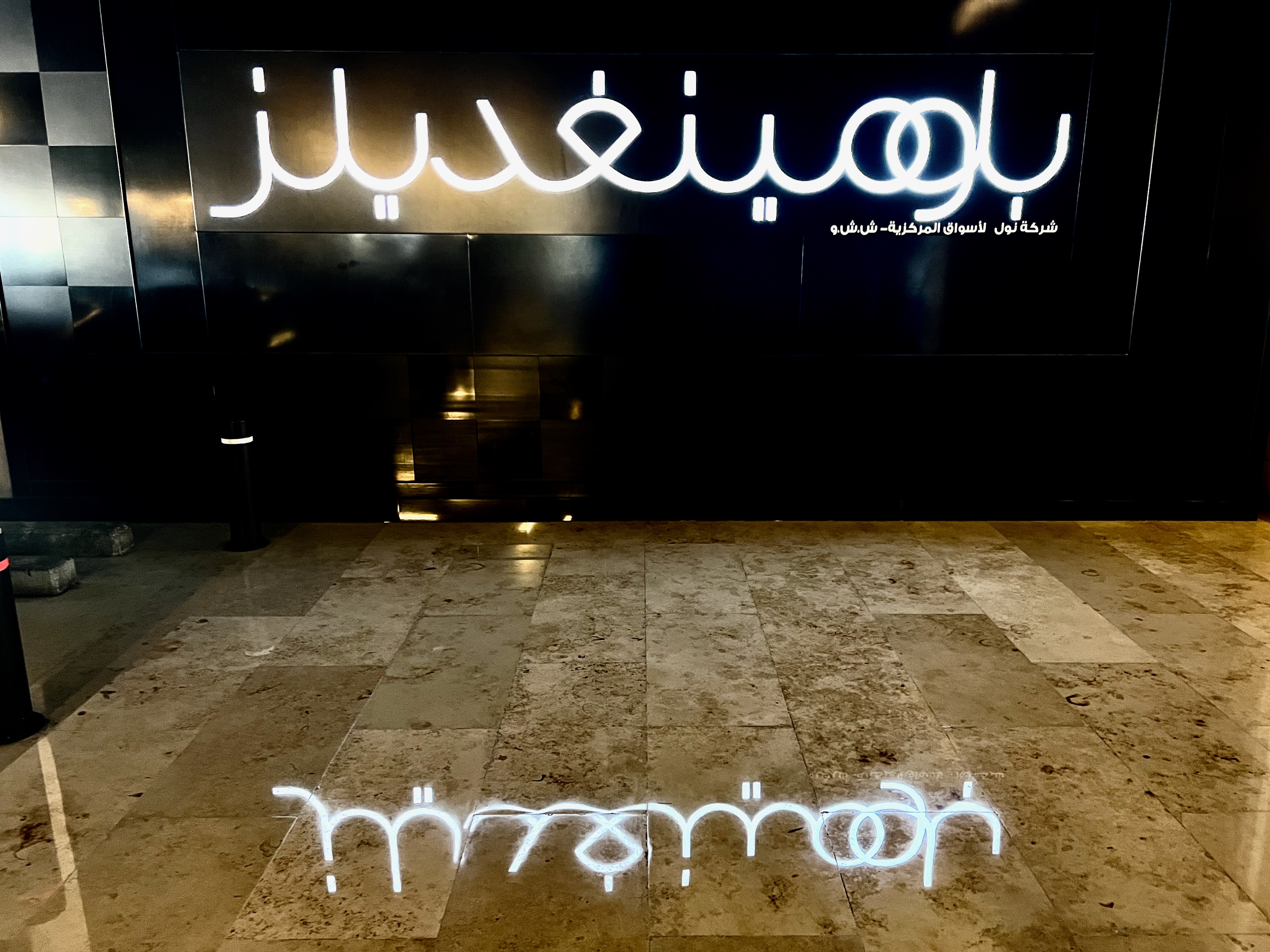
Bloomingdale's / بلومينغديلز sign in Arabic, 360 Mall, Kuwait

== See also ==
- Selfridges
- Rinascente
- El Corte Inglés
- Dead mall
- Retail apocalypse
