= Joseph B. Bloomingdale =

American businessman (1842–1904)

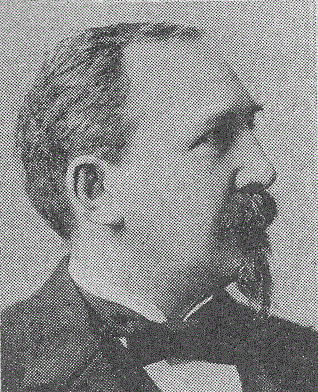
- Born: Joeseph Bernard Bloomingdale; December 22, 1842; New York City, New York, United States
- Died: November 21, 1904 (aged 61); New York City, New York, United States
- Occupation: Retail businessman
- Known for: Co-founder of Bloomingdales Department Store
- Spouse: Clara Coffman
- Children: Rosalie Bloomingdale Sperry; Lewis Bloomingdale
- Parent(s): Hannah Weil; Benjamin Bloomingdale
- Family: Lyman G. Bloomingdale (brother)

Joseph Bernard Bloomingdale (December 22, 1842 – November 21, 1904) was an American businessman who in April 1872, with his brother Lyman, founded department store Bloomingdales Inc. on 59th Street in New York City.

== Biography ==
Bloomingdale was the son of Bavarian-born, German Jewish immigrant Benjamin Bloomingdale and Hannah Weil, Joseph and his brother Lyman were trained in the retailing of ladies' clothing at their father's store. Going into business for themselves, the Bloomingdale brothers' new store sold a wide variety of European fashions, anchored by their own buying office in Paris. Their success resulted in the business outgrowing its premises and in 1886 they relocated operations to its famous present-day location at 59th Street and Third Avenue where Bloomingdale's became one of the most widely recognized brand names in the world.

Bloomingdale retired from the business on New Year's Day 1896. He was married to Clara Coffman. They had two children: Rosalie Stanton Bloomingdale Sperry (1876–1958) and Lewis Morgan Bloomingdale (1878–1939). He died in 1904 and was buried in the Linden Hill Jewish Cemetery in Ridgewood, New York.
