= Vestergade 1, Copenhagen =

Building in Copenhagen

Vestergade 1
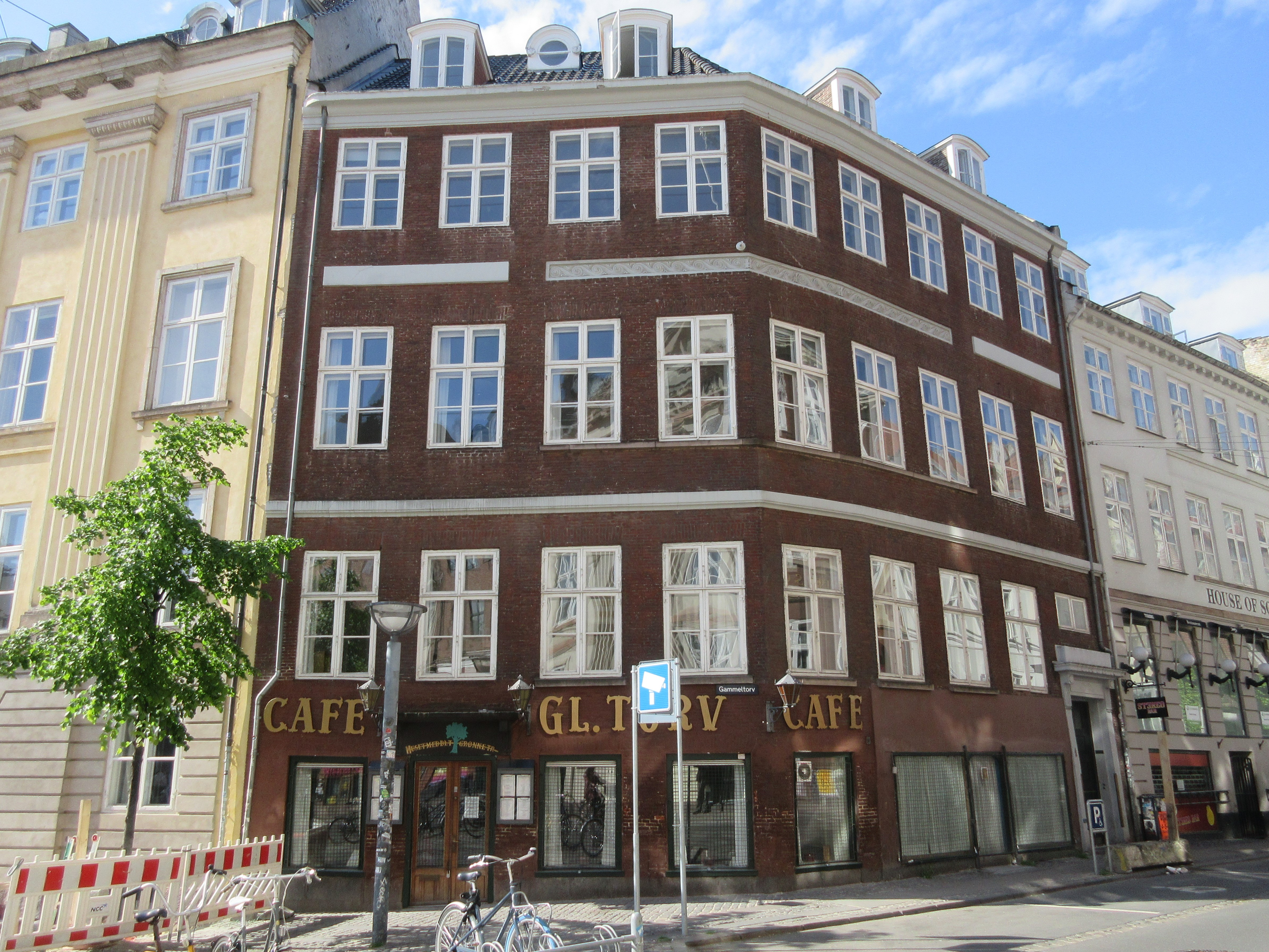
- The building seen from Gammeltorv
- Interactive map of the Vestergade 1 area

General information
- Location: Copenhagen, Denmark
- Coordinates: 55°40′41″N 12°34′17″E
- Completed: 1796

Vestergade 1 is a Neoclassical property located at the corner of Gammeltorv (No. 20) and the street Vestergade (No. 1) in the Old Town of Copenhagen, Denmark. The facade towards Gammeltorv and Vestergade meet in an Obtuse angle with four bays towards the square and five bays towards the street. The building was listed in the Danish registry of protected buildings and places in 1950. Café Gammel Torv, a traditional Danish lunch restaurant, has since 1910 been based in the basement at Gammeltorv 20. The building/restaurant is now colloquially known as The House With The Green Tree after an eponymous 1942 novel by Kalvin Lindemann.

== History ==
=== 18th century ===
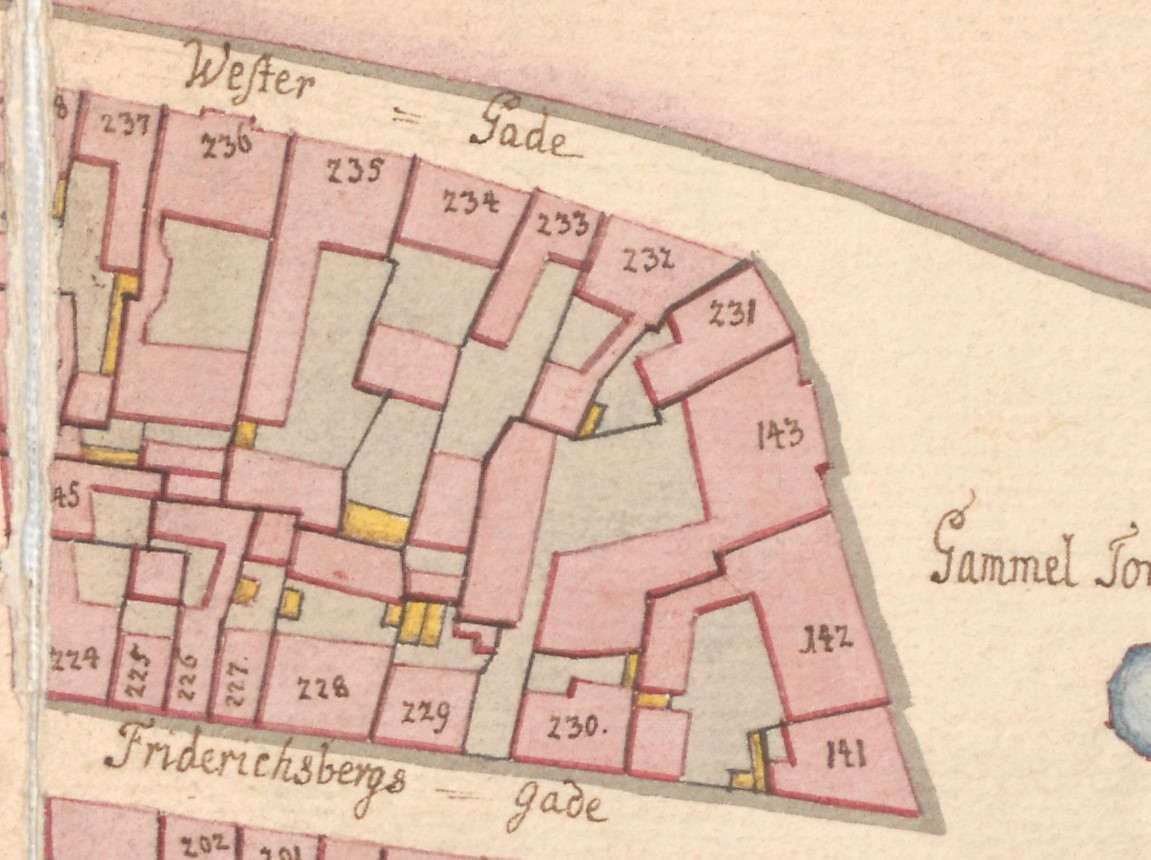
No. 231 and No. 232 seen on a detail from Christian Gedde's map of Copenhagen's West Quarter, 1757.

The building on the site was from 1671 home to a beer vendor (æltapper) and tavern. It was initially operated by M. S. Bjerre who also rented out rooms to the peasants who came into town on market day to sell their produce on Gammeltorv.

The site was in the late 17th century part of two separate properties. By 1689, when Copenhagen's first cadastre was launched, they were listed as No. 217 and No. 219. The owners at that time were Niels Nielsen Slagelse (No. 217) and merchant Niels Nielsen Slagelse and merchant Dines Simonsen.

In the new cadastre of 1756, the old No. 217 was listed as No. 231. It was at that time owned by merchant (urtekræmmer) Jens Dreyer. The old No. 218 was listed as No. 232 and was owned by merchant (høker) Hans Henrik Herfordt.

=== Holm fanuky ===
At the time of the 1787 census, No. 231 was home to two households. Jens Reimand, a man living on his means. resided in the building with his wife Karen Frost, the 57-uear-old lodger Maria Temler and one maid. Henrich Holm (1761–1830), a 26-uear-old merchant (urtekræmmer) and the elder brother of Jacob Holm, resided in the building with two employees (aged 16 and 20). No. 232 was also home to two households. Peder Waagens Gulstrup, a merchant (hørkræmmer), resided in the building with his wife Anna Marie Anchersen, their two sons (aged two and three), two apprentices and two maids. Jomfrue Gertrud Anna Schou and Jomfrue Ellen Catrine Schou, who had served as chamber maids for Princess Charlotte Amalie, and Queen Sophie, respectively, resided in the building with two maids.

The building was destroyed in the Copenhagen Fire of 1795. No. 231 was subsequently merged with a section of No. 232 (No. 243A). The present building was constructed in 1796 for grocer (Urtekræmmer) Henrik Holm.

At the time of the 1801 census, No. 231 was home to a total of four households.Henrich Holm resided in his building with his wife Michaline Dorothe Smidt and their six children (aged one to seven). One of their children was the later architect Mads Schifter Holm. Christiane Sophie Holm, Holm's mother, resided in another apartment with two employees in her son's business (one of them an apprentice), a caretaker, a maid, a nanny, a wet nurse, a female cook and two lodgers (brothers, aged 22 and 28). Rasmus Hansen, a 6+-year-old merchant, resided in the building without family or staff. Lovise Hansen, a 54-year-old widow, resided in the building with a female cook and a maid.

In the new cadastre of 1806, Holm's property was listed as No. 39.

Holm's business and property was after his death in 1830 taken over by his second youngest son Georg Frederik Holm. At the time of the 1840 census, he was based on the ground floor with his wife Frederikke Holm (née Brummer), two employees in his firm, a caretaker and two maids. Michaeline Dorthea Holm (née Schmidt), Holm's widow, resided on the second floor with five of her unmarried children and the theologian Julius Ferdinand Møller. Carl Vilhelm Lange, a military prosecutor, resided on the second floor with his Antoniette Frederikke Lange (née Pontoscie), their two children (aged four and eight) and two maids.

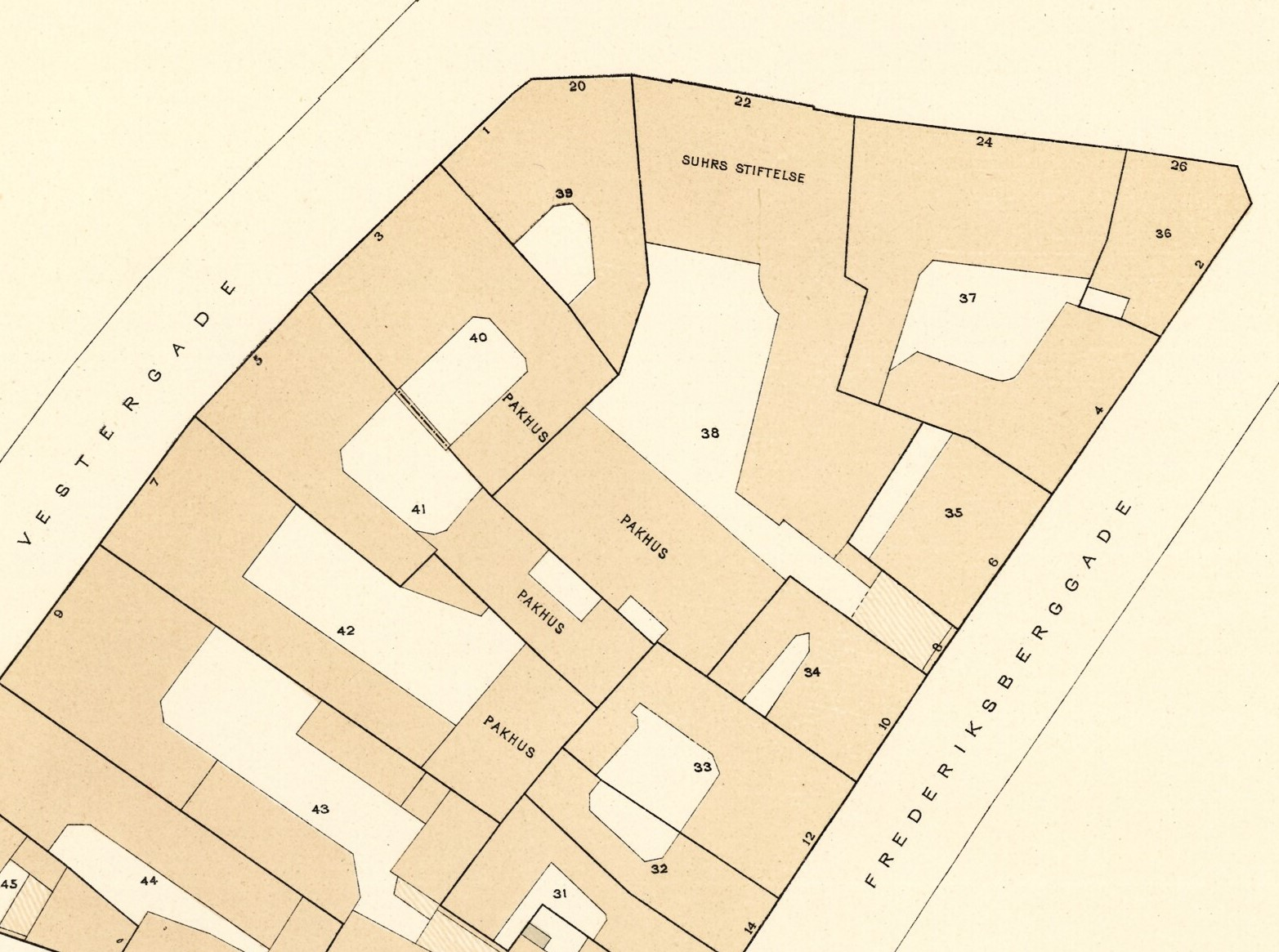
Vesterhade 1 seen on a detail from one of Berggreen's block plans of Western Quarter, 1886–88.

Georg Frederick Holm's property was home to 17 residents in three households at the 1850 census. The owner and his wife resided on the ground floor with their 10-year-old son Frederick Henrik Holm, Holm's sister Christine Malesine Holm, a grocer (employee), a grocer's apprentice, one male servant and two maids. Peter Herslel Classen Smidth, a captain in the Royal Danish Nacy, resided on the first floor with his wife Nicoline Smidth, their three-year-old daughter and two maids. Christiane Tönder and Frederikke Tönder, two unmarried sisters with pensions, resided on the second floor with one maid.

At the 1860 census, Holm's property was home to three households. Georg F Holm with his sisters Karen and Kirstine, two grocers (employees), two maids and a caretaker. Rebecca Valentin, wudiw if a wholesaler (grosserer), resided in the building with two children (aged 17 and 20), Sara Benjamin and two maids. Isaar Halburstad, a man with unknown profession, resided in the building with his wife Mathilde Halburstad and a maid.

== Architecture ==
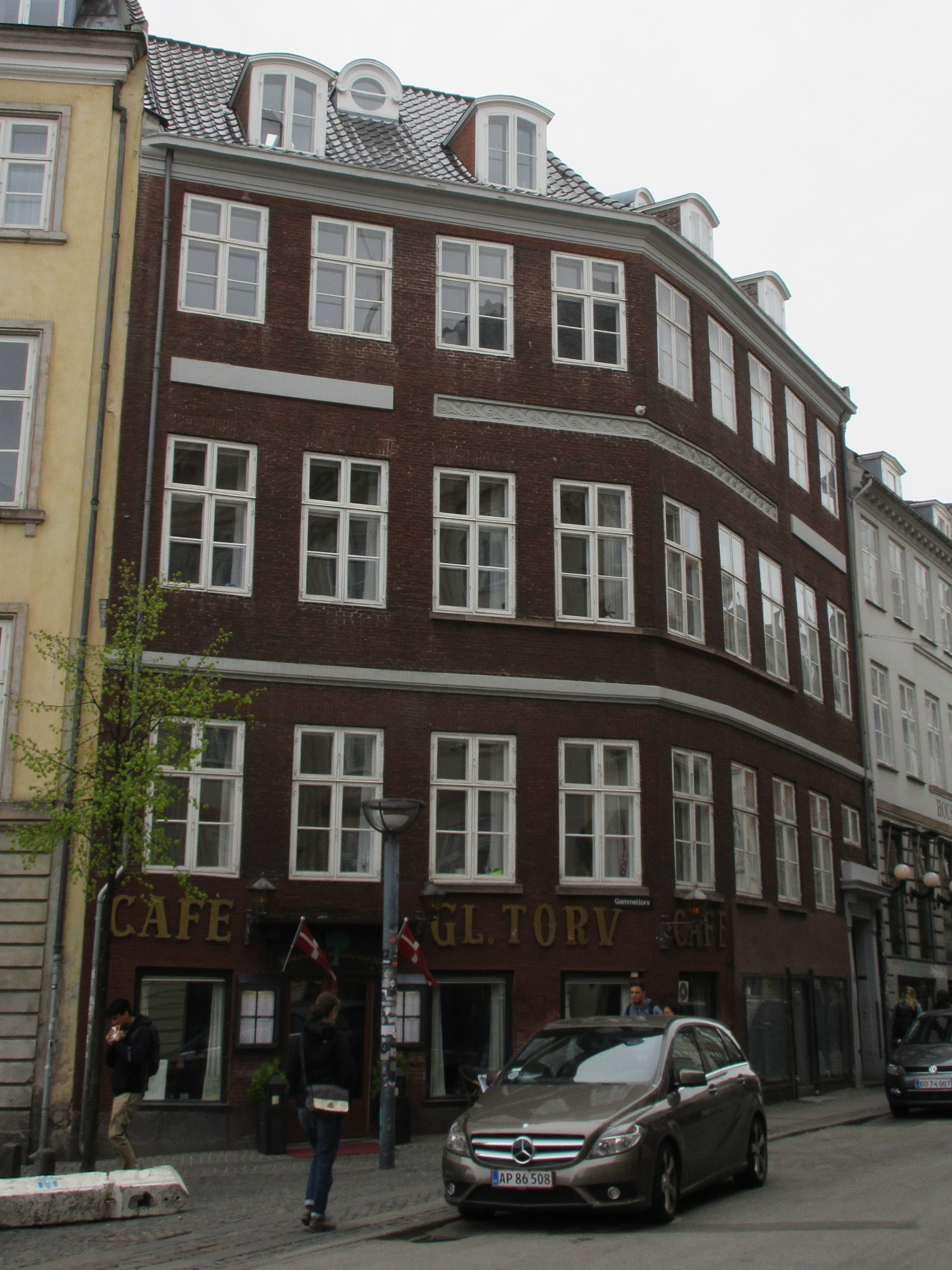
Vestergade 1

Vestergade 1 is constructed with three storeys over a walk-out basement. . The facade of the building is broken in an obtuse angle with four bays facing Gammeltorv and five bays facing Vestergade. The building is constructed in red brick and stands on a stone plinth. The ground floor is red washed while the upper floors stand in undressed brick. There is a frieze between the five central windows on the second and third floors, flanked by two white-washed bands between the two outer windows on each side. The roof is glad with black winged tiles towards the street and red winged tiles towards the courtyard. It features six dormer windows towards the street. The building was listed in the Danish registry of protected buildings and places in 1950.

== Café Gammel Torv ==
Café Fammel Torv is a lunch restaurant with a menu dominated by smørrebrød and other traditional Danish lunch dishes. It was opened in 1910 by Charlotte A. Jensen.

== Cultural references ==
Kelvin Lindemann's 1942 novel Huset med det grønne træ ("The House With the Green Tree") is a family saga about a fictional wealthy family of colonial merchants and slave traders who resides in the building.

== See also ==
- Obel House
