= Vestergade 5, Copenhagen =

Historic building in Copenhagen, Denmark

Vestergade 5
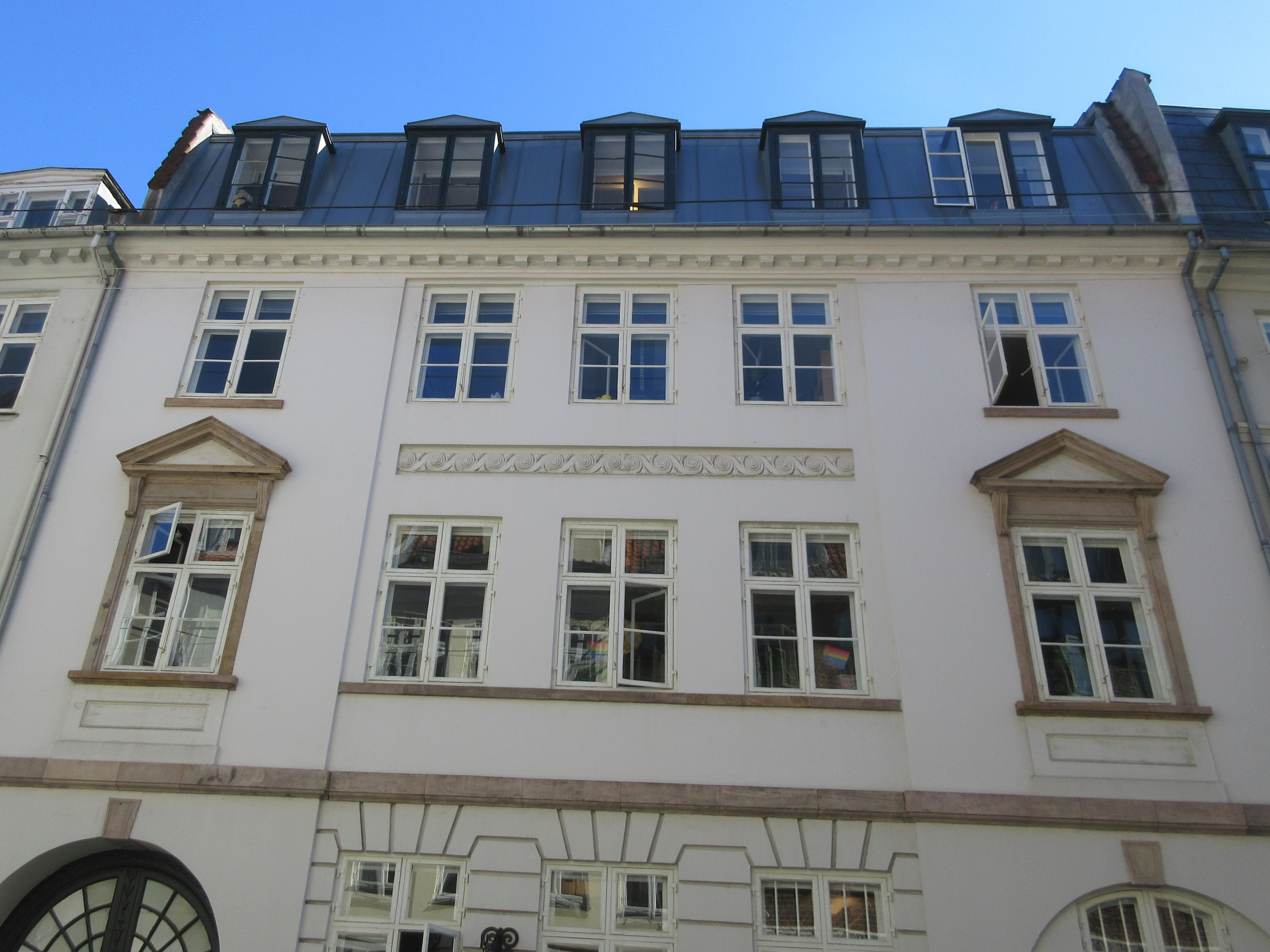
- Interactive map of the Vestergade 5 area

General information
- Location: Copenhagen, Denmark
- Coordinates: 55°40′40″N 12°34′16″E
- Completed: 1797

Vestergade 5 is a Neoclassical property in the Old Town of Copenhagen, Denmark. The building was constructed for the owner of the tobacco manufacturer Chr. Augustinus Fabrikker in 1797, and the company was until 1870 based in the complex. It was listed in the Danish registry of protected buildings and places in 1918.

== History ==
=== 17th century ===
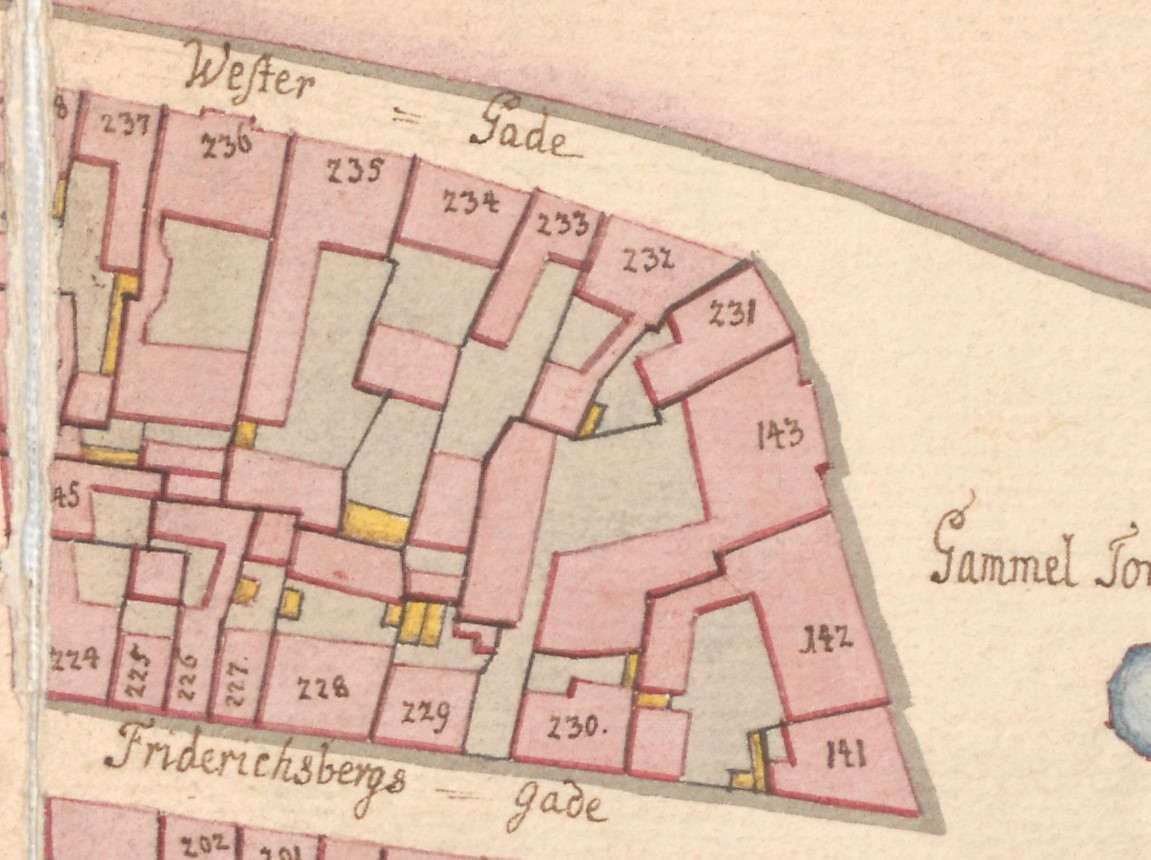
No. 234 seen in a detail from Christian Gedde's map of Copenhagen's West Quarter, 1757

Tobacco manufacturer Ole Augustinus, founder of the company now known as Chr. Augustinus Fabrikker, constructed a new building at the site in the 1770s. In the new cadastre of 1756, Augustinus' property was listed as No. 234 in the city's West Quarter (Vester Kvarter). It was at that time owned by tanner Hans Peter Krog.

At the time of the 1787 census, No. 234 was home to four households. Otte Buch, a 66-year-old duer, resided in the building with his wife An.M. Kammermeyer, a 21-year-old apprentice, a caretaker and a maid. ChristianFischer, a 70-year-old biolong, resided alone in another dwelling. Elisabet Gram and Dorthea Gram, two unmarried sisters with means (aged 67 and 56), resided in the building with one maid. Peder Lund, a beer seller (øltapper), resided in the building with his wife and an 11-year-old orphaned girl.

The property was in 1791 acquired by tobacco manufacturer Christian Augustinus. He from then on ran his tobacco business from the premises.

The building was together with the rest of the quarter destroyed in the Copenhagen Fire of 1795. The current building was constructed for Augustinus in 1796–1797. The building towards the street contained apartments, while the tobacco factory was based in a side wing, as was normal at the time.

=== 19th century ===
At the time of the 1801 census, No. 234 was home to three households. Christian Augustinus resided in one of the apartments with his wife Birgitte Marie (née Benfeldt), their six children (aged one to 18), three employees in Augustinus' tobacco business (two of them apprentices), a caretaker, a female cook, a maid and the 47-year-old def man Lars Brøde el Brode. Marie Elisabeth Bartholin (née Lassen), widow of Johan Eichel Bartholin, a Supreme Court judge and owner of Svanholm and Aastrup, resided in the building with two of her children (aged 15 and 26), the 15-year-old niece Sophie Lassen, a female cook and a maid. Henrich Dreyer, a lawyer, resided in the building with his wife Dorthe Margrethe Henningsen, their two children (aged two and three), a female cook and a maid.

Augustinus' property was listed in the new cadastre of 1806 as No. 41 in the Western Quarter.

Jost van Dockum (1753-1834), a naval lieutenant who had been in charge of the Prøvestenen Battery during the Bombardment of Copenhagen in 1807, lived in one of the apartments in 1809–11. Another naval officer, Counter Admiral Lorenz Fjeldrup Lassen (1756-1837), was among the residents in 1817–1818. Chr. Augustinus left the building when a new tobacco factory on Gammel Kongevej in Frederiksberg was inaugurated in 1870.

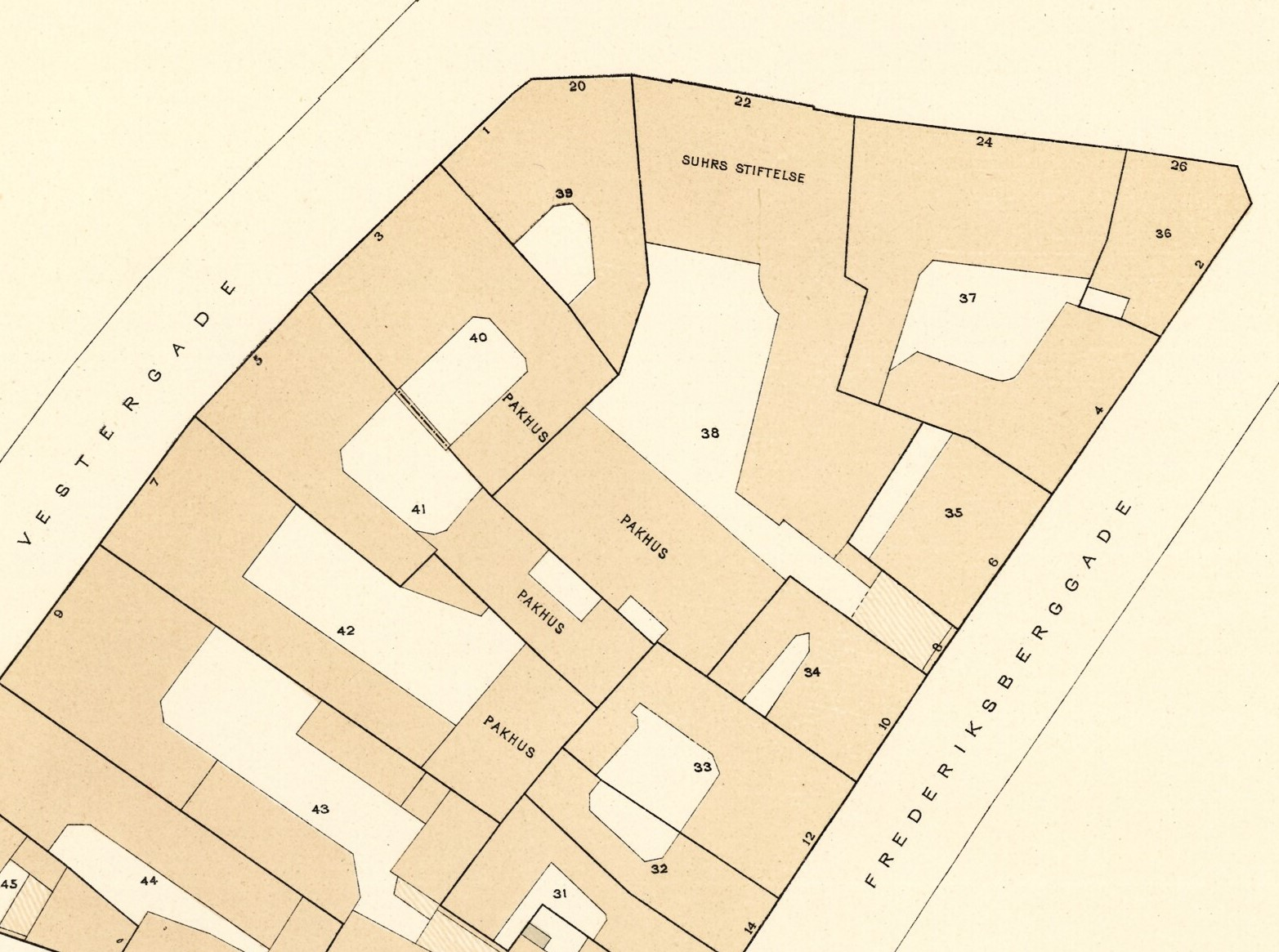
Vesterhade 5, seen in a detail from one of Berggreen's block plans of Western Quarter, 1886–88

At the time of the 1840 census, No. 41 was home to two households. P. Augustinus was now residing on the ground floor with his wife Caroline M. Augustinus, their nine-year-old son Ludvig A. C. Augustinus and two maids. Birgithe Marie Augustinus resided in the first floor apartment with two unmarried daughters (aged 23) and one maid.

O.T. Augustinus resided in the building with his son Ludvig A.C. Augustinusm senior clerk Clemens Block and three other office clerks at the 1850 census.

At the 1860 census, No. 41 was home to three households. Peter and Anna Christine Møller resided in the building with Anna Marie Møller and one maid. L.C. Augustinus and Isedora Augustinus resided in the building with their two children (aged three and four) and two maids. Lauritz Frederik Fischer, a civil servant with title of justitsråd, resided in the building with his wife Sophie Frederikke Fischer født Pagh, their two sons (aged 18 and 23) and a maid.

=== 20th century ===
Hans Prehn's brushmaker's business was based in the building in the years around 1950.

== Architecture ==
The building consists of three floors over a walk-out basement. The building is five bays wide and the two outer bays are wider than the three central ones. The two outer windows on the second floor are topped by triangular pediments.

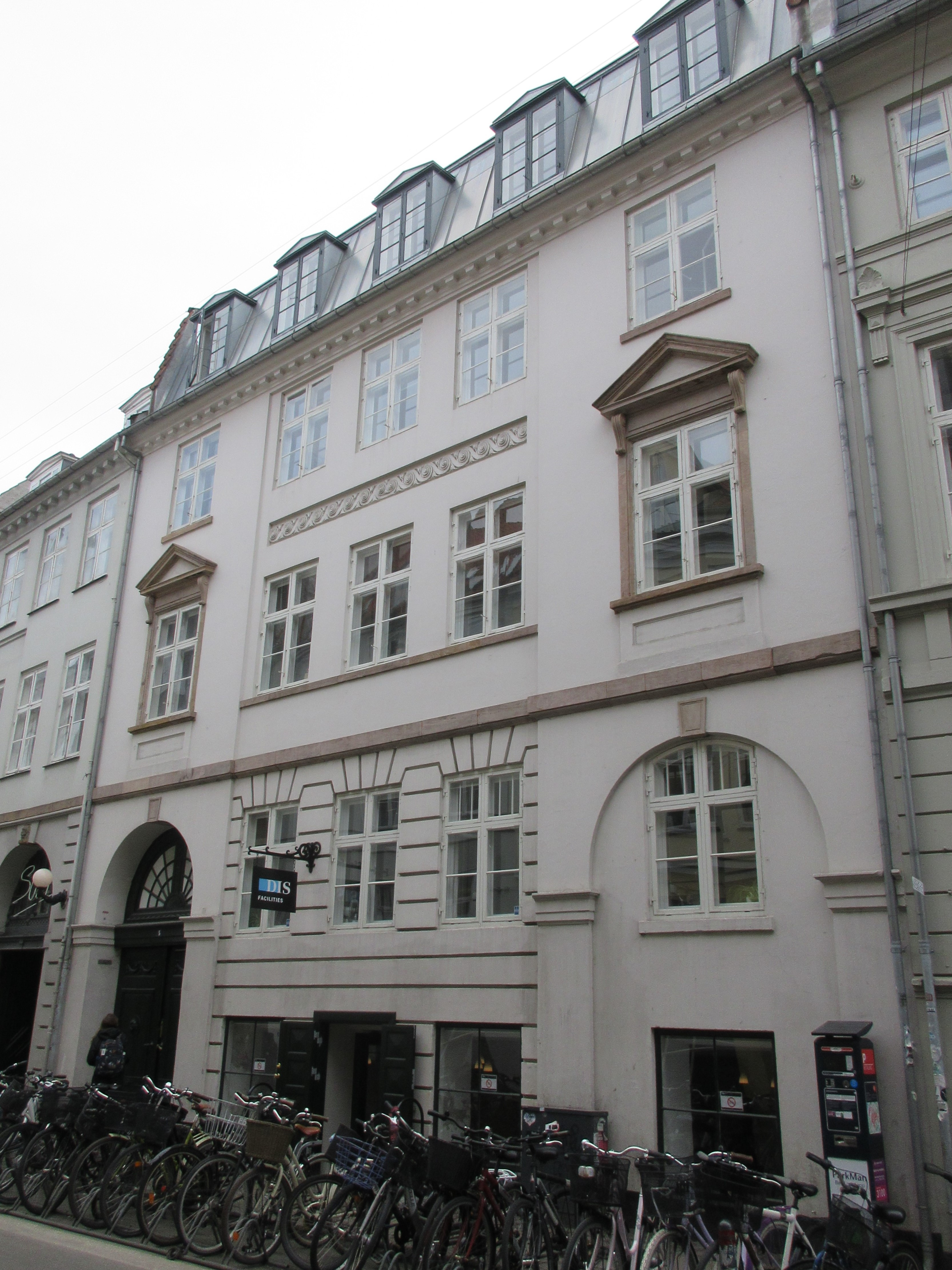

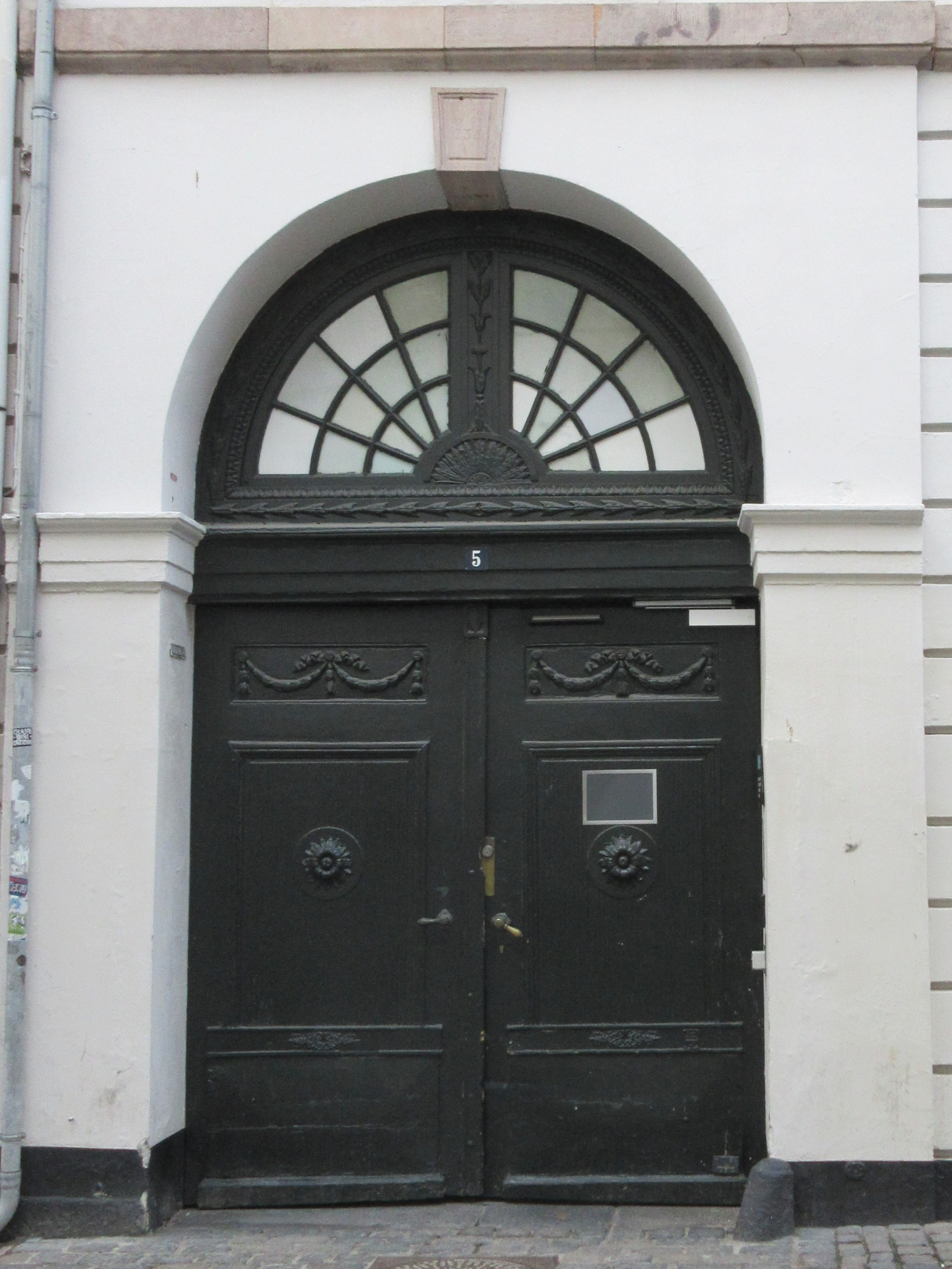
The gate

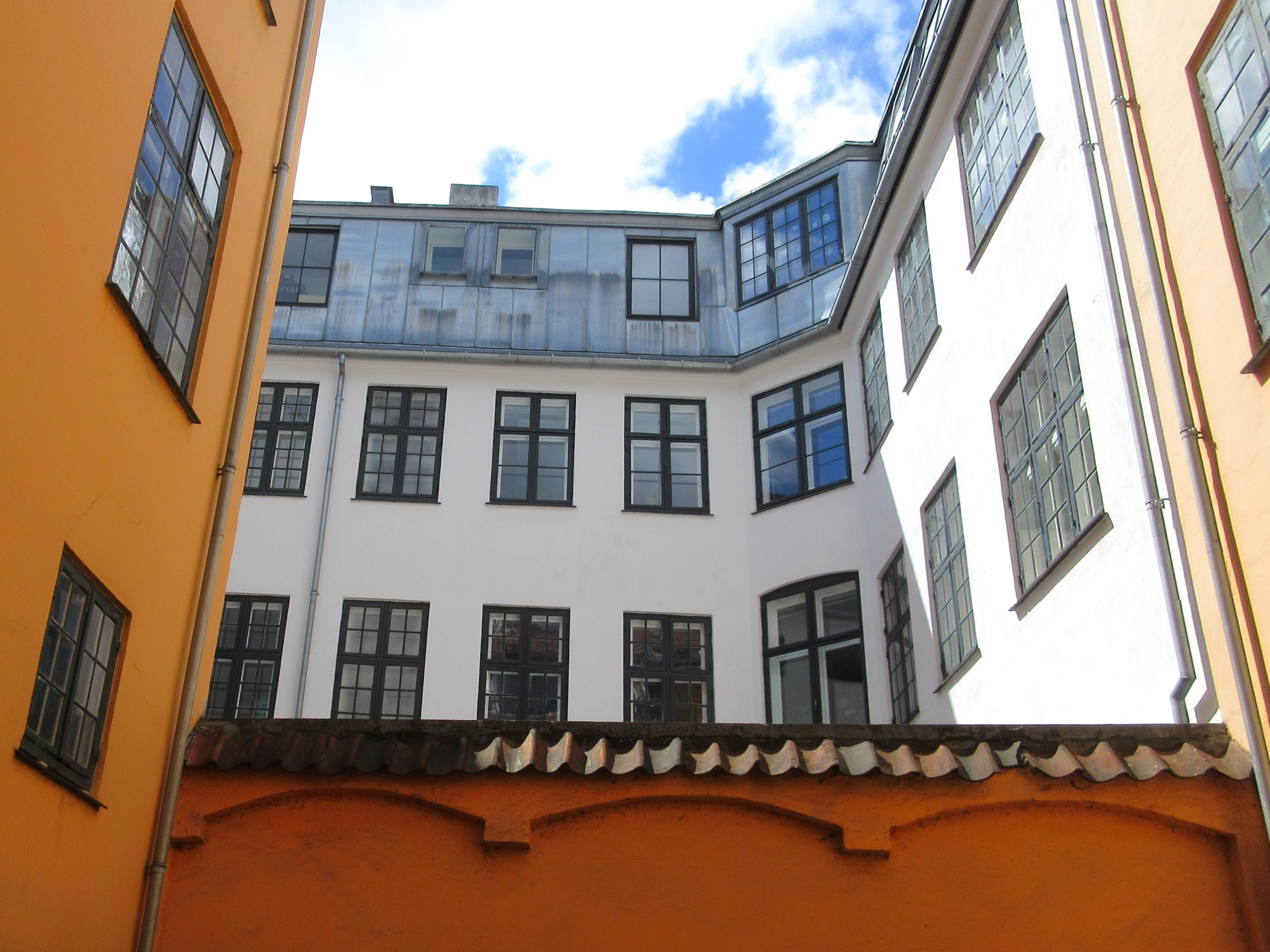
The side wing seen from the courtyard of No. 3

== See also ==
- Obel House
