= E. Nobel =

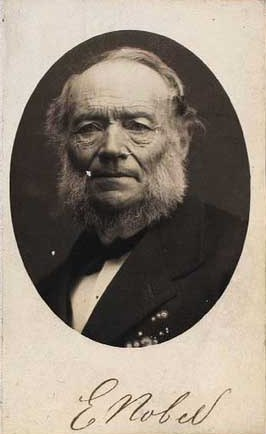
Danish businessman and politician Emilius Ferdinand Nobel (1810-1892).

E. Nobel was a tobacco company based in Copenhagen, Denmark.

== History ==
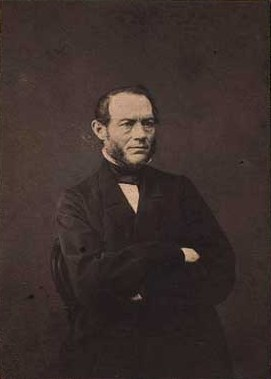
Emilius Ferdinand Nobel by Harald Frederik Jensen

The company was founded when Christian Kastrup opened a tobacco factory at Vestergade 11 (formerly No. 44) in 1806. The company was in 1854 acquired by E. F. Nobel (1810-1892). He had back in 1835 established a tobacco company in Nykøbing Falster but that company was now left in the hands of and later acquired by B. C. Nobel (1825–1890) and H. Baagøe (died 1900).

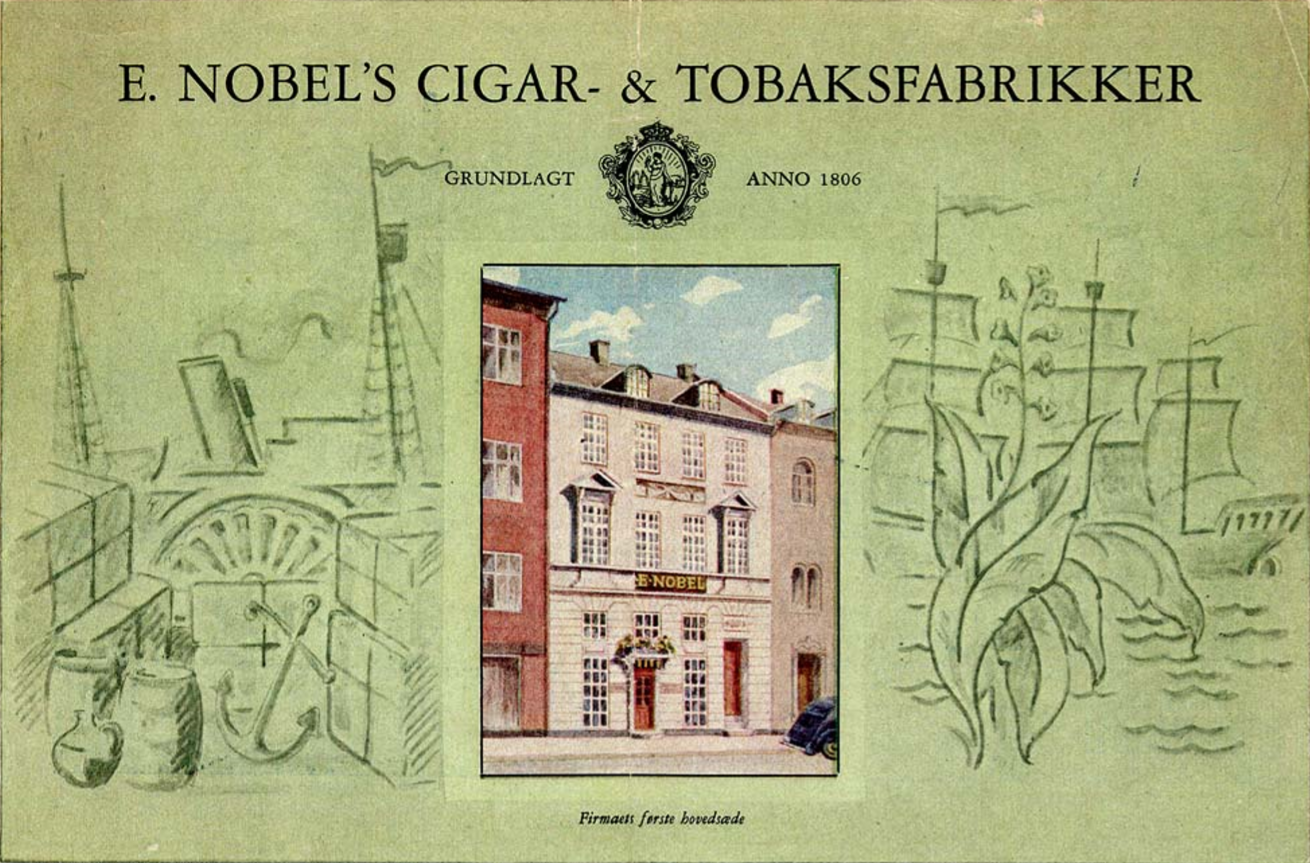
E. Nobel: Its building at Vestergade 11 is seen in the middle.

E. F. Nobel's new venture in Copenhagen grew rapidly and he soon expanded it with a large, new cigar factory at Smallegade in Frederiksberg (now Porcelænshaven) and a chewing tobacco factory at Prinsessegade 60 (formerly 50) in Christianshavn. The Frederiksberg site was later ceded to the Royal Porcelain Factory in exchange for the porcelain factory's site at Prinsessegade 62 (formerly 52).

E. F. Nobel made T. S. Braun a partner in the company in 1855 and Nobel's son Chr. P. Nobel (1841–1899) became a partner in 1879. T. S. Braun's son, P. Braun, became a partner in 1887. Bruun Sr. died shortly thereafter and the firm was the following year split in two when Nobel's son kept the cigar and smoking tobacco activities while Braun's two sons continued the chewing tobacco activities under the name Brødr. Braun.

E. F. Nobel's death in 1892 left Chr. P. Nobel as the sole owner of the company. After his death in 1899 it was continued by his widow, Nanna Nobel, and son, E. F. Nobel (1875-1941).

The Nykøbing Falster company was continued by B. C. Nobel and H. Baagøe until B. C. Nobel's death in 1890. His share of the company was passed to his son, Emil Nobel (1861–1906). H. Baagøe died in 1900 and the company was then continued by Emil Nobel alone until his death in 1906. The company was then passed to his widow, Emma Nobel, but H. Nobel (born 1880), a son of Chr. P. Nobel and Nanna Nobel), became a partner. The company was in 1908 taken over by E. Nobel in Copenhagen and H. Nobel then joined his mother and elder brother as a partner.

E. Nobel merged with Chr. Augustinus Fabrikker and Horwitz & Kattentid under the name De Danske Cigar- & Tobaksfabrikker in 1919. E. F. Nobel and H. Nobel were both board members of the new company.

In 1938, E. F. Nobel and H. Nobel bought E. Nobels Fabrikker out of the merger. E. F. Nobel died in 1941 and his share of the company was then taken over by his son B. Nobel. One of H. Nobel's sons, H. J. Nobel, became a partner in 1945.

== Legacy ==
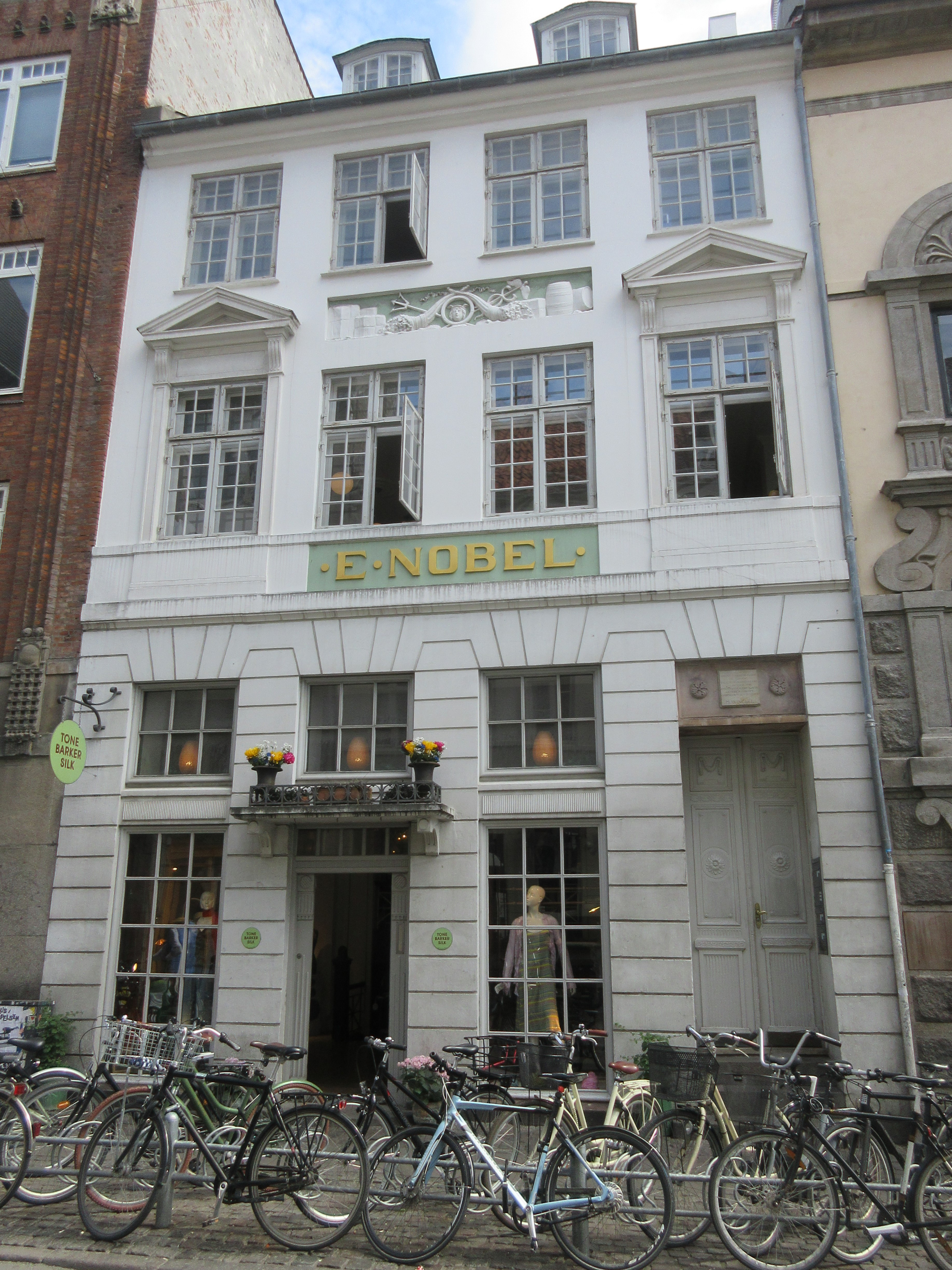
Vestergade 11

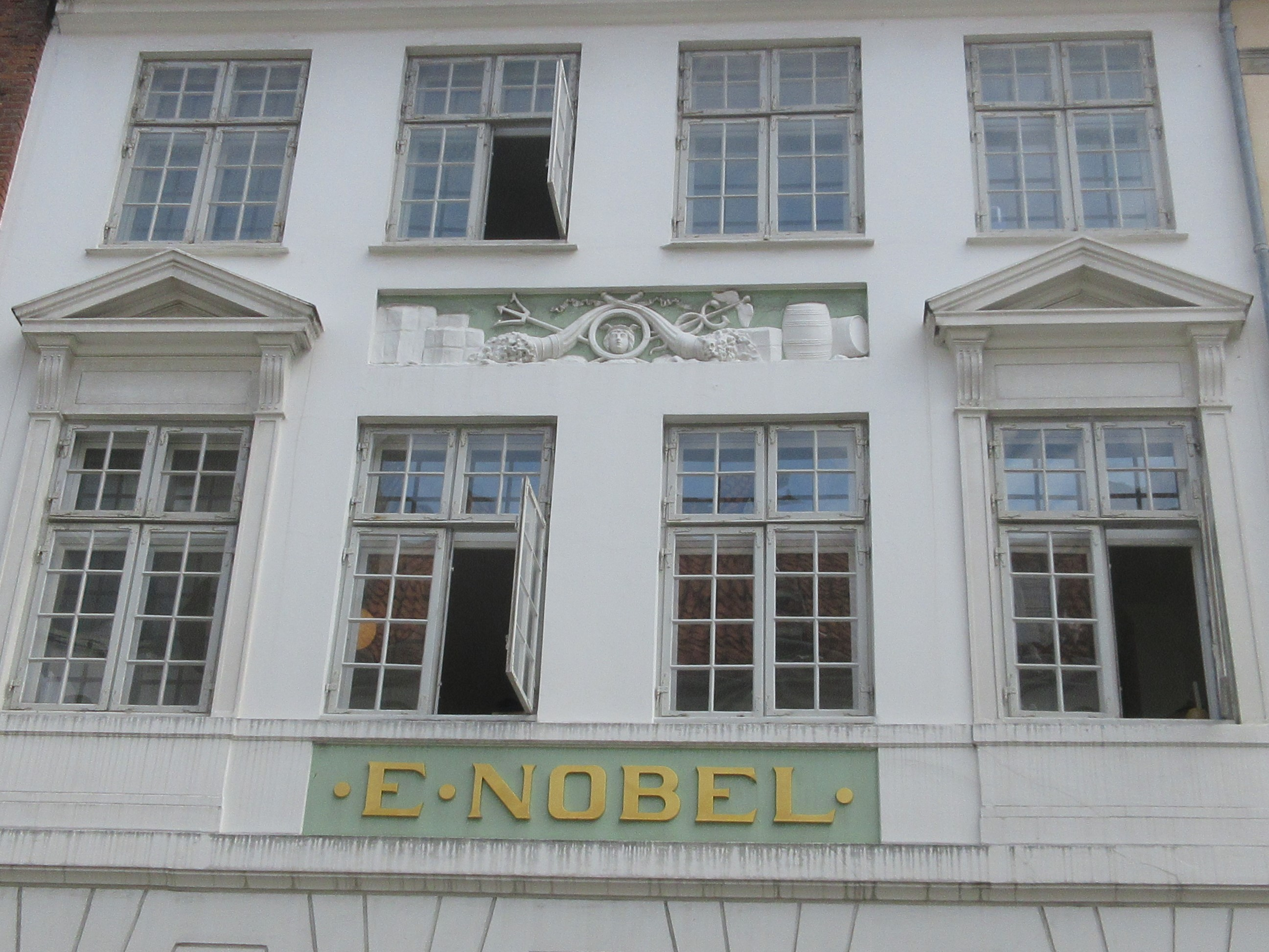
Vestergade 11

The company name is still seen on the facade of its former building at Vestergade 11 in Copenhagen. Its former factory at Prinsessegade 60–62 is now used by Christianshavn Gymnasium.

The cigar factory in Nykøbing Falster was taken over by Scandinavian Tobacco Group in 1991. It closed in 2016. The youngest part of the building is from 1939.

== See also ==
- N. B. Clemmensen
