= Hans Lassen Martensen =

Danish bishop and academic

The Right Reverend Hans Lassen Martensen
- Diocese of Zealand
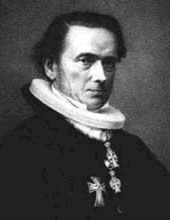
- Church: Church of Denmark
- Diocese: Diocese of Zealand
- In office: 1854–1884
- Predecessor: Jacob Peter Mynster
- Successor: Bruun Juul Fog

Personal details
- Born: 19 August 1808 Flensburg, Duchy of Schleswig (present day Germany)
- Died: 3 February 1884 (aged 75) Copenhagen, Denmark
- Buried: Assistens Cemetery
- Education: University of Copenhagen

Hans Lassen Martensen (19 August 1808 – 3 February 1884) was a Danish bishop and academic. He was a professor at the University of Copenhagen and Bishop of the Diocese of Zealand.

== Early life ==
Martensen was born in a middle-class Lutheran family in Flensburg, in the Duchy of Schleswig (now Germany), as the only son of Hans Andersen Martensen (1782–1822) and Ane Marie Truelsen (1781–1853). At that time Schleswig was a duchy between Holstein and Denmark. He grew up in a German-speaking society, while his father who was a schoolmaster, writer and sea-captain preferred to use Danish. Consequently, the young Martensen upbrought in a multicultural situation and reconciliation of different cultures became his one of central interests through his life.

He was schooled at the Metropolitanskolen and studied theology at the University of Copenhagen and later was ordained in the Danish Church. Between 1834 and 1836 he travelled to foreign countries. He visited several cities including Berlin, Munich, Vienna and Paris. He met influential intellects including David Strauss (1808–1874). During his travel, he began to read mystics; Meister Eckhart, Johannes Tauler and Jakob Böhme. Also he studied Dante's The Divine Comedy with a great interest.

== Career ==
At Copenhagen he was lektor in theology in 1838, professor extra-ordinarius in 1840, court preacher also in 1845, and professor ordinarius in 1850. Once he was offered to a bishopric from the Church of Sweden but declined. In 1854 however he gave up his educational career and was made bishop of Zealand, the Danish Primate. In his studies he had come under the influence of Friedrich Schleiermacher (1768–1834), Georg Wilhelm Friedrich Hegel (1770–1831) and Franz Xaver von Baader (1765–1841); but he was a man of independent mind, and developed a peculiar speculative theology which showed a disposition towards mysticism and theosophy.

== Personal life ==
Martensen was married to Helene Mathilde Hess (19 March 1817 – 20 September 1847), daughter of ship captain and harbour superintendent at Nyhavn District Peter Mathias Hess (1787–1851) and Mette Christine Hansen (c. 1788–1825), on 22 December 1838 in the Garrison Church in Copenhagen. They had one son, Julius Martensen (1839–1910), who would become a literary historian. She died just 30 years old in 1847.

He married, secondly, to Virginie Henriette Constance Bidoulac (8 April 1817 – 13 May 1904), daughter of language teacher Joseph B. (c. 1765–1839) and Marie Sørensen (1782–1850), on 10 November 1848.

Martensen lived in a now demolished building at Ved Stranden 4 in 1833–1834 and then at Gråbrødretorv 6 in 1835–1838. His next home was in the no longer existing street Hummergade at No. No. 15. He then lived in the Obel House at Vestergade 2 from 1853 to 1854 before occupying the Bishop's House in Nørregade for the remainder of his life.

Martensen died on 3 February 1884 in Copenhagen and was buried at Assistens Cemetery.

== Legacy ==
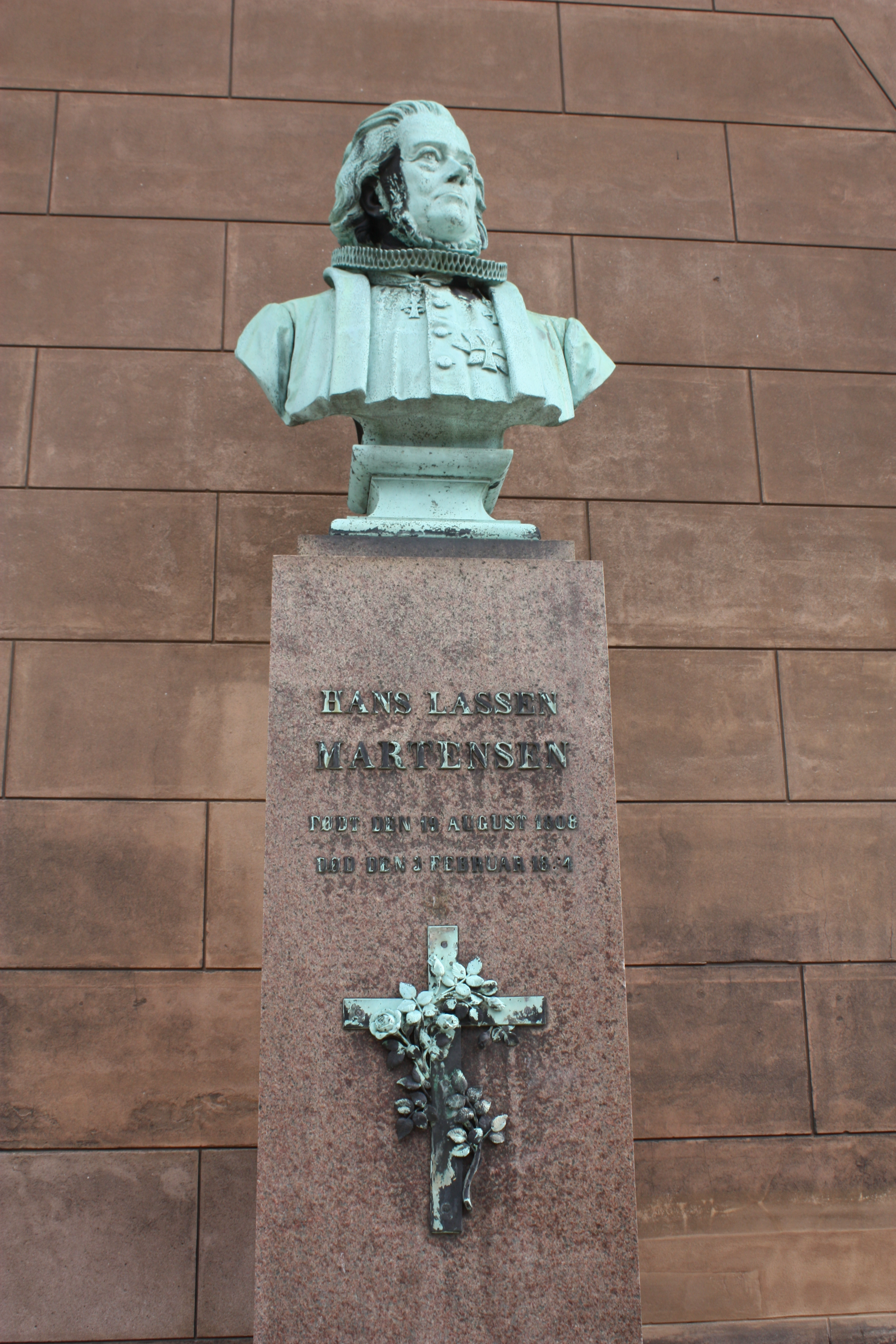
Bust of Martensen on Frue Plads in Copenhagen

His contributions to theological literature included treatises on Christian ethics and dogmatics, on moral philosophy, on baptism, and a sketch of the life of German philosopher Jakob Böhme (1575–1624) whose works exercised a marked influence on the mind of English theologian William Law (1686–1761).

Martensen was a distinguished preacher, and his works were translated into various languages. The "official" eulogy he pronounced upon Bishop Jacob Peter Mynster (1775–1854) in 1854, in which he affirmed that the deceased man was one of the authentic truth-witnesses of Christianity to have appeared in the world since apostolic times, brought down upon his head the invectives of Danish philosopher Søren Kierkegaard. Icelandic theologian Magnús Eiríksson (1806–1881), who lived in Copenhagen from 1831 until his death, was very critical of Martensen's speculative theology, which he attacked in various publications from 1844 to 1850.

Theobald Stein created a portrait bust of him in 1876. A bronze copy was installed on Frue Plads in 1888. A marble copy is part of the collection of the Museum of National History at Frederiksborg Castle in Hillerød. David Monies painted a portrait painting of him in 1842. Peder Severin Krøyer painted a portrait painting of him in 1874 and copied it in 1884 (Roskilde Cathedral).

== Accolades ==
- 1847: Knight in the Order of the Dannebrog
- 1854: Cross of Honour
- 1859: Commander in the Order of the Dannebrog
- 1869: Grand Cross of Denmark
- 1879: Rank of Excellency

== Selected works ==
- Grundriss des Systems der Moralphilosophie (1841; 3rd ed., 1879; German, 1845)
- "Dr. S. Kierkegaard mod Dr. H. Martensen: et indlaeg". 1856.
- Die christliche Taufe und die baptistische Frage (2nd ed., 1847; German, 2nd ed., 1860)
- "Christian Dogmatics: A Compendium of the Doctrines of Christianity English translation (1874)". 1898.
- "Christian Ethics (1871; Eng. trans., Part I. 1873".
- "Christian Ethics Part II. 1881". 1899.
- Hirtenspiegel (1870–1872)
- Katholizismus und Protestantismus (1874)
- Jacob Boehme; Studies in his Life and Teaching (1882; Eng. trans., 1885, reprint 1949)

An autobiography, Aus meinem Leben, appeared in 1883, and after his death the Briefwechsel zwischen Martensen und Dorner. A selection of his letters has been published as Biskop Martensens Breve.
