= Palægaragerne =

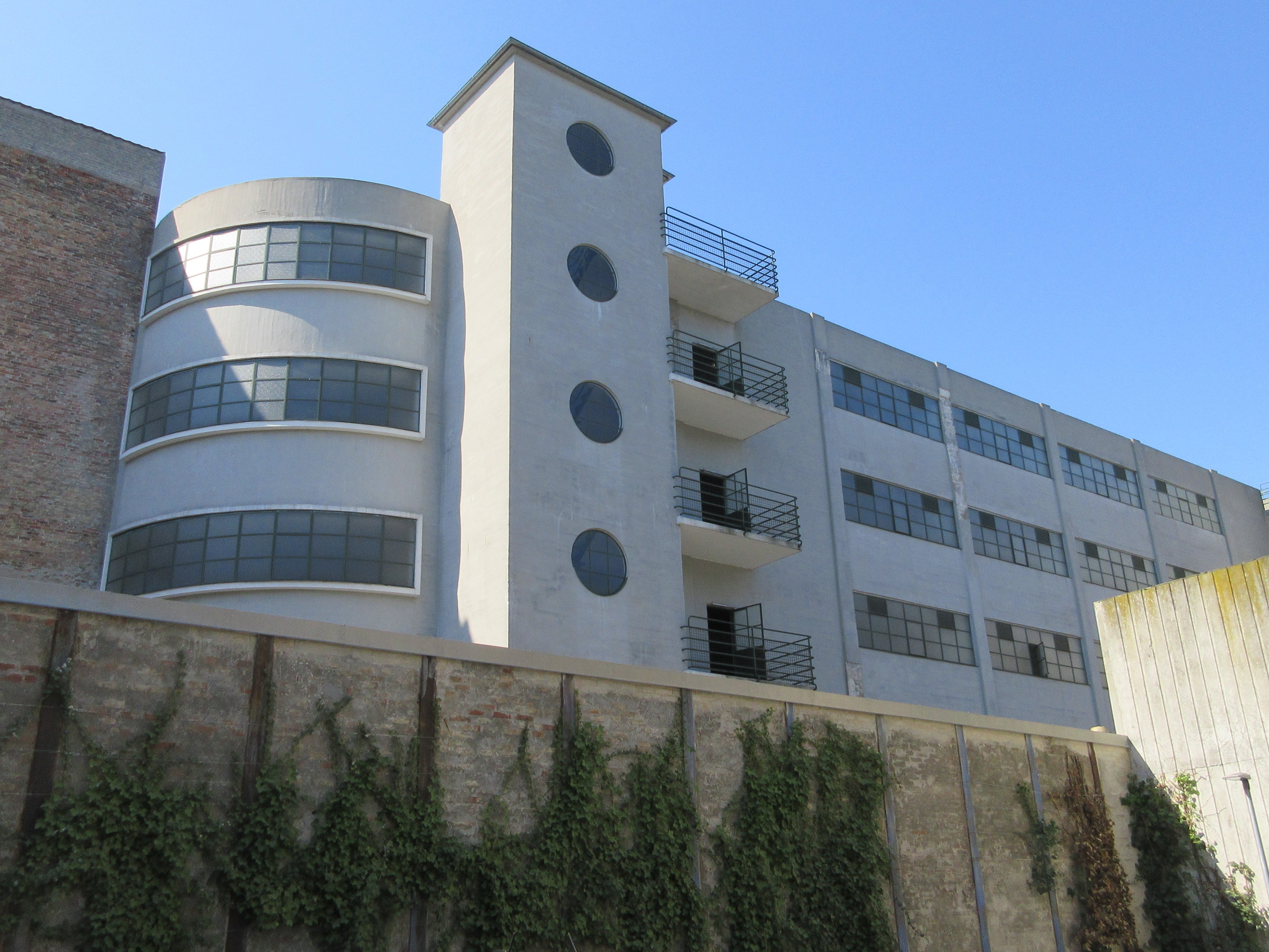
- Interactive map of the Palægaragerne area

General information
- Architectural style: Modernism
- Location: Dronningens Tværgade 4, Copenhagen, Denmark
- Coordinates: 55°41′1.83″N 12°35′19.49″E
- Completed: 1934
- Owner: Jeudan

Design and construction
- Architect: Oscar Gundlach-Pedersen

Palægaragerne (lit. 'The Mansion Garages') is an early Modernist parking facility and filling station located in a narrow courtyard at Dronningens Tværgade 4 in central Copenhagen, Denmark. It was built in the early 1930s and was the first multi-storey parking facility in Denmark. It takes its name after the neighboring Moltke Mansion. The parking facility and the canopy over the filling station were listed on the Danish registry of protected buildings and places by the Danish Heritage Agency on 13 July 1994. It is now owned by the property company Jeudan.

== History ==
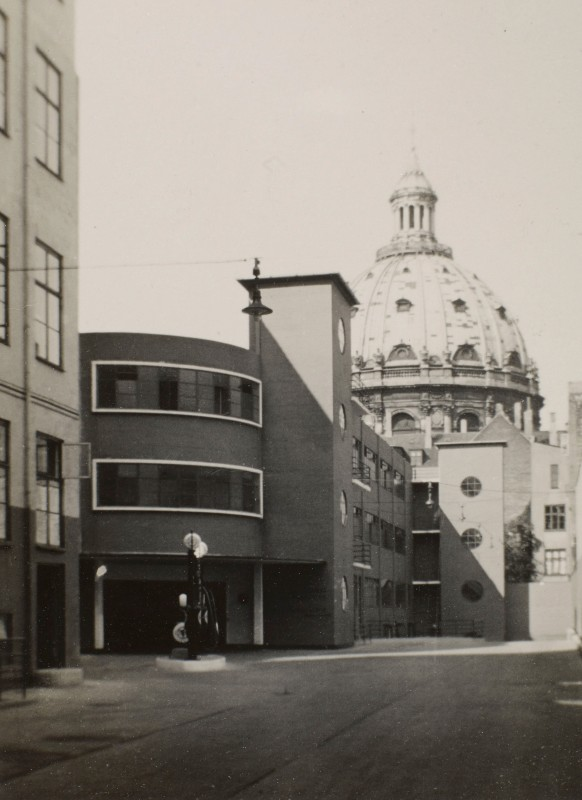
Palægaragerne prior to the expansion in 1934

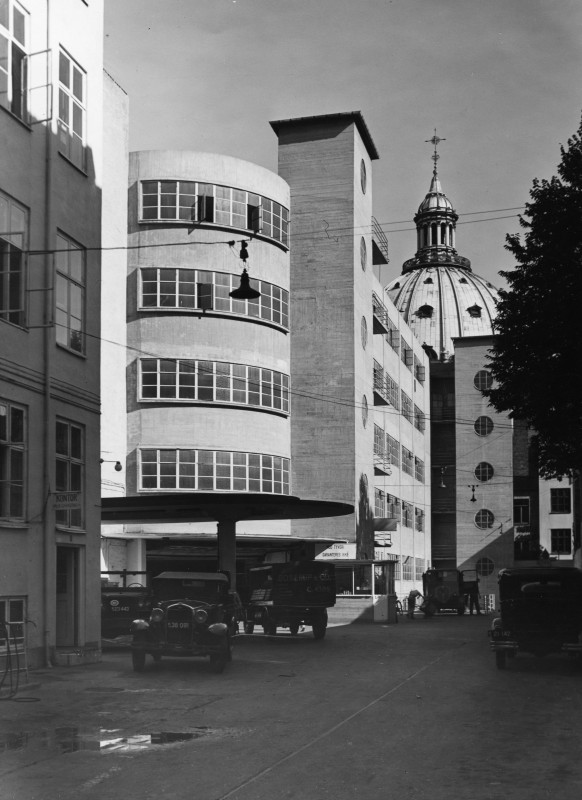
Palægaragerne after the expansion in 1934

The building fronting the street (No. 4) and the adjacent building at No. 6 were both built by the master builder J. H. Lütthans. He was the owner of the Moltke Mansion and the two buildings were constructed in its former gardens.

The parking facility was built for the company A/S Løppenthin & Feilberg in response to the increasing number of cars in the city in the early 1930s. The complex was designed by Oscar Gundlach-Pedersen and built in 1932 by the construction company Højgaard & Schultz. It was expand with two extra floors in 1934.

It was listed on the Danish registry of protected buildings and places by the Danish Heritage Agency on 13 July 1994. The complex was refurbished for the owner Jeudan by Elgaard Architecture in 2012-2015.

== Architecture ==
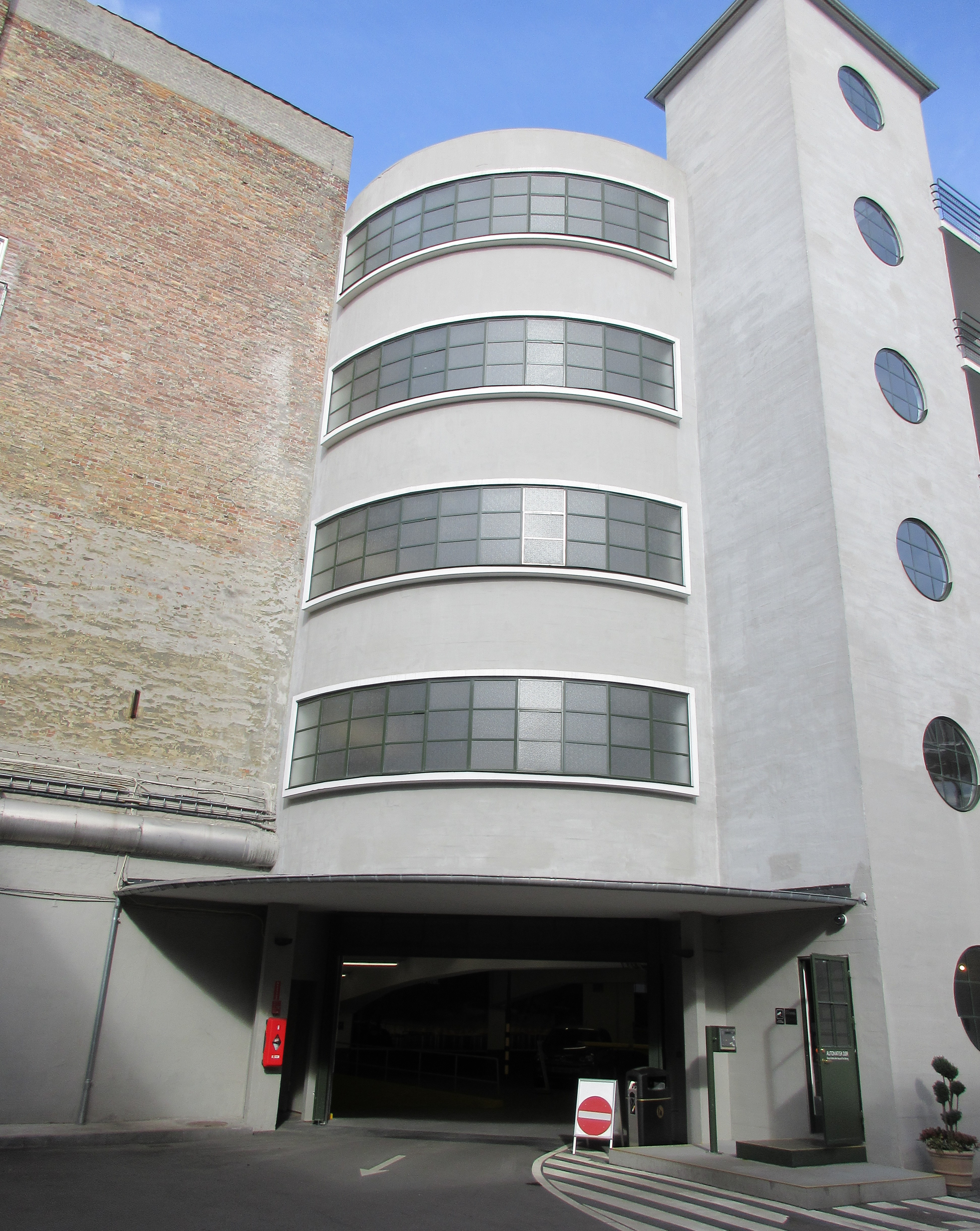
The filling station1934

The five-level parking facility was designed with inspiration from American principles. It is built in reinforced concrete with iron windows.

In front of the entrance to the parking facility is a filling station with a canopy remnicient of Arne Jacobsen's two years younger but more famous Skovshoved Petrol Station. The service station also included a car wash.

== Cultural references ==
The parking facility is used as a location in the 1977 film Alt på et bræt.

== See also ==
- Skovshoved Petrol Station
- Mountain Dwellings
