= C.W. Obel =

Danish investment company

- Type: Private
- Industry: Property, private equity
- Founded: 1787
- Founder: Christen Winther Obel
- Headquarters: Copenhagen, Denmark
- Area served: Denmark
- Key people: Anders Obel (CEO); Henning Kruse Petersen (Chairman)
- Website: www.cwobel.dk

C.W. Obel is a former Danish tobacco manufacturing company which now serves as an investment company fully owned by the foundation Det Obelske Familiefond. Its activities comprise real estate and private equity investments as well as partial ownership of Scandinavian Tobacco Company, Tivoli A/S and Fritz Hansen through Skandinavisk Holding A/S.

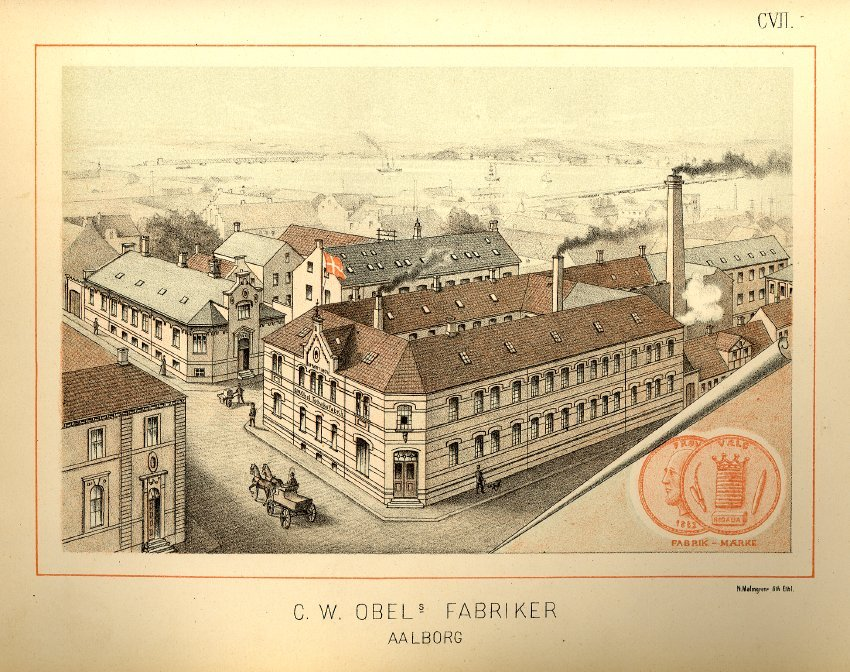
C. W. Obel's factory in Aalborg

== History ==
The company was founded in 1787. On his mother's and stepfather's death in 1828, Christen Winther Obel took over the factory, changing its name to C.W. Obel. Under Obel's leadership, the factory became the city's main employer, a position it maintained for many years.

In 1857, steam engines were introduced in the production and a production of cigars was set up. The factory was several times damaged by fires and a new factory was built on the outskirts of Aalborg in 1898. It was later expanded several times. In 1919, C.W. Obel opened a branch in Copenhagen.

In 1937, the company was converted into a family-owned stock company (aktieselskab) and the Copenhagen branch moved into newly acquired premises in Obels Gård at Vestergade No. 2. The Obelisk Family Fund (Det Obelske Familiefond) was established in 1956. In 1961, C.W. Obel merged with Chr. Augustinus Fabrikker and R. Færchs Fabrikker under the name Skandinavisk Tobakskompagni. In 1971, C.W. Obel A/S was listed on Copenhagen Stock Exchange but was delisted in 2001.

== Company ==
The company is headquartered in Obels Gård at Vestergade 2 in Copenhagen.

=== C.W- Obel Ejendomme ===
In 1998, the real estate division was established under the name C.W. Obel Ejendomme A/S, a wholly subsidiary owned by C.W. Obel A/S. C.W. Obel Ejendomme owns a portfolio of approximately 50 properties in Copenhagen, Aalborg and Aarhus.

=== Skandinavisk Holding A/S ===
C.W. Obel owns 35% of Skandinavisk Holding which owns 51% of Scandinavian Tobacco Group, 100% of Fritz Hansen and 31% of Tivoli A/S. The foundation Augustinus Foundation (Augustinus Fonden) owns the remaining 65% of the company.

=== Equity investments ===
- Semco Maritime A/S (100%)
- SGD-Bera A/S (100%)
- Danfoss Semco A/S
- Fire Protection (40%)
- Dansk Mink Papir A/S (28%)

(owned through DMP Partners A/S)

- Erhvervsinvest II K/S
- CMC Biologics Sarl (10%)

(owned through European Equity Partners)

== C.W. Obel Foundation ==
The Obelisk Family Fund (Det Obelske Familiefond) was established in 1956. the foundation is based in Aalborg. It makes donations to philanthropic projects, especially in North Jutland, as well. It also supports members of the Obel family.

== Related reading ==
- Marianne Rostgaard og Inger Blads: Tobakken og byen - C.W. Obels Tobaksfabrik 1787-1995; Aalborgbogen 2004. udg. Published by Selskabet for Aalborgs Historie in collaboration with Aalborg Stadsarkiv and Aalborg Historiske Museum
- Bender, Henning: Aalborgs Industrielle Udvikling fra 1735 til 1940. Aalborg Kommune, 1987.
