= Chr. Augustinus Fabrikker =

Danish tobacco company

- Type: Private limited company
- Industry: Investment
- Founded: 1750
- Founder: Ole Augustinus
- Headquarters: Copenhagen, Denmark
- Key people: JØRGEN TANDRUP (Chairman), Claus Gregersen (CEO)

Chr. Augustinus Fabrikker ("Christian Augustinus Industries") is a former Danish tobacco company which now serves as the investment company of the Augustinus Foundation.

== History ==
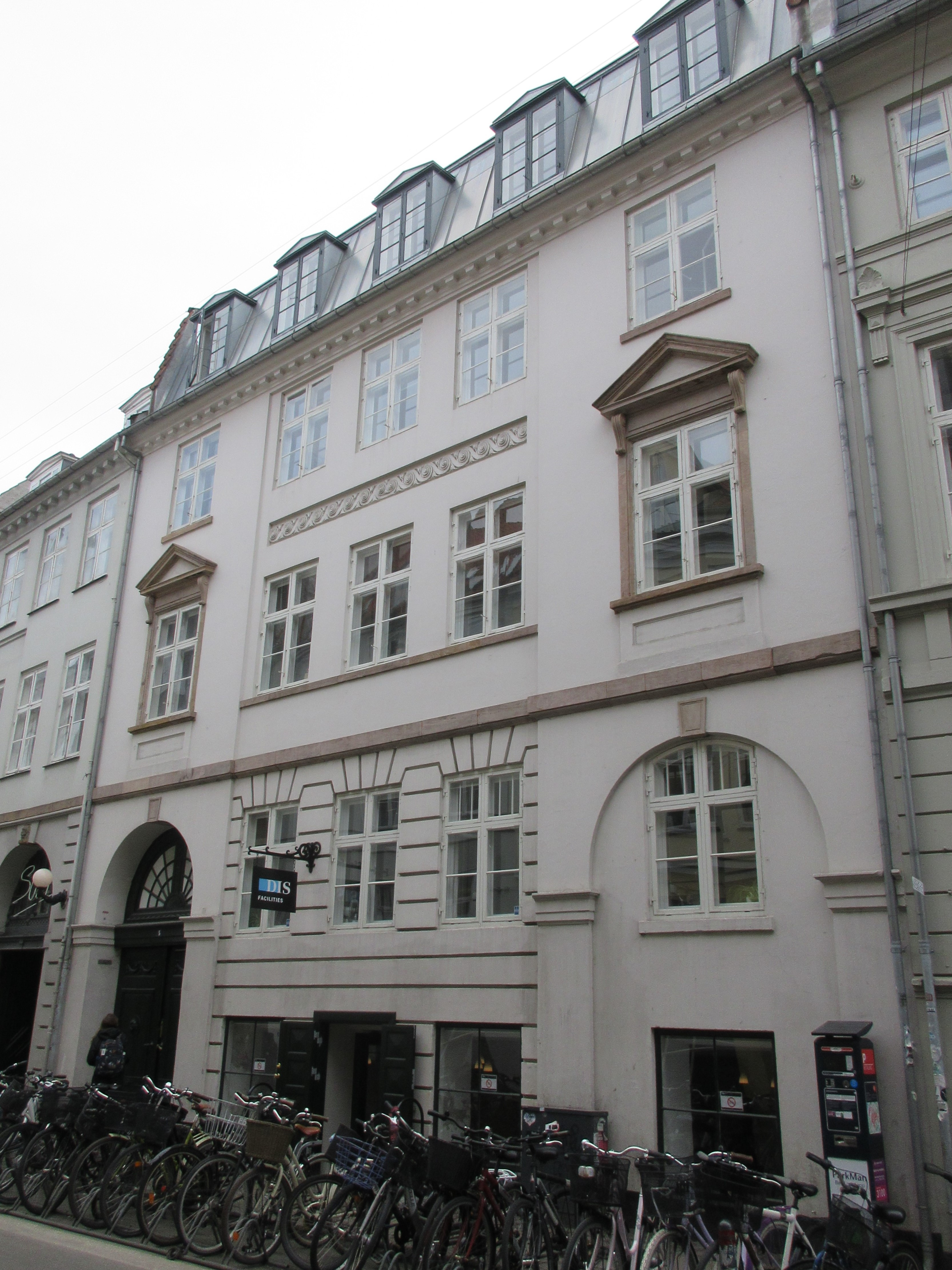
Vestergade 5: The company's home from 1795 to 1870

The company was founded by Ole Augustinus on 11 May 1750 when he established a tobacco factory on Frederiksborggade. A new building at Vestergade 8 was inaugurated in the 1770s. Augustinus three sons were all active in the venture. The eldest of them, Christian Augustinus, from whom it later took its name, took over the operations after their father's death in 1779. The building in Vestergade was destroyed in the Copenhagen Fire of 1795 but the current building at the site was completed a few years later.

A new tobacco factory on Gammel Kongevej in Frederiksberg was inaugurated in 1870.

The company established a tobacco factory at Gullandsgade on Amager in 1914. The company later changed its name to Chr. Augustinus after it had been taken over by Ole Augustinus' son Christian Augustinus.

In 1919, Christian Augustinus established De Danske Cigar- & Tobaksfabrikker ("The Danish Cigar and Tobacco Factories") in a partnership with E. Nobel and A/S Horwitz & Kattentid but the company was changed to Chr. Augustinus Fabrikker after A/S Horwitz & Kattentid was bought out in 1933 and E. Nobel was bought out in 1938 although A/S De Danske Cigar- & Tobaksfabrikker was kept as a secondary name. The company acquired A/S Horwitz & Kattentid in 1949.

The Augustinus Foundation was established in 1942 at the initiative of Ludvig Augustinus. In 1861 Chr. Augustinus Fabrikker merged its tobacco-related activities with those of C.W. Obel and R. Færchs Fabrikker under the name Skandinavisk Tobakskompagni.

== Headquarters ==
The company is headquartered at Sankt Annæ Plads 13 in central Copenhagen.

== See also ==
- E. Nobel

== Portfolio ==
Chr. Augustinus Fabrikker is a stakeholder in a number of prominent Danish companies:

- Abacus Medicine A/S (33 %)
- Blazar Capital ApS (>20 %)
- Corti ApS (<10 %)
- Dawn Health A/S (>10 %)
- Fritz Hansen A/S (100 %)
- GUBI A/S (24 %)
- Gyldendal A/S (31 %)
- itm8 A/S (19%)
- Jeudan A/S (41 %)
- Kurhotel Skodsborg A/S (100 %)
- Lunar A/S (<5 %)
- Podimo ApS (>10 %)
- Royal Unibrew A/S (c. 15 %)
- Scandinavian Tobacco Group A/S (+25 %)
- Tivoli A/S (57 %)
- Veo Technologies ApS (>10 %)
- Zenegy ApS (19%)
