= Christen Winther Obel =

Danish businessman

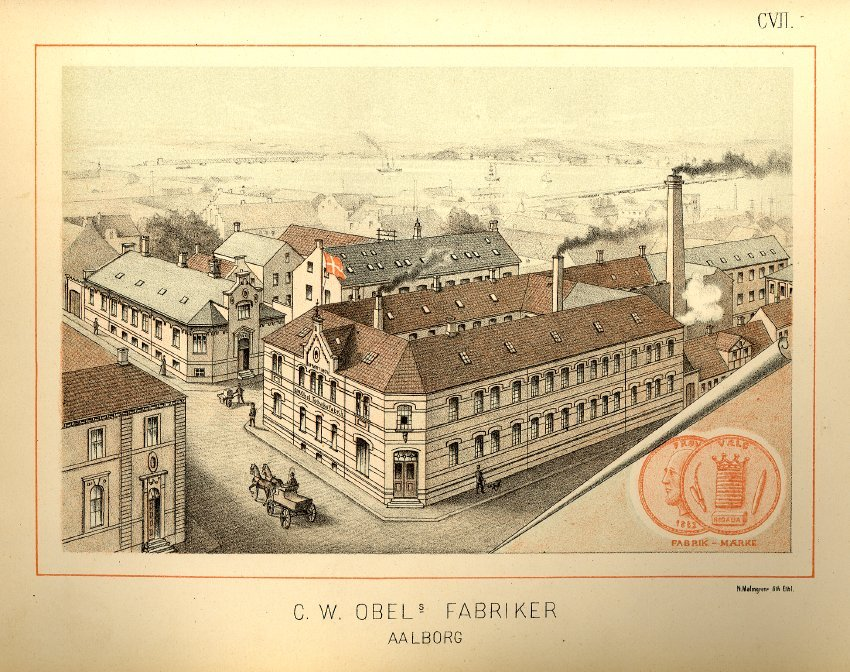
C. W. Obel's factory in Aalborg

Christen Winther Obel (1800–1860) was a Danish businessman from the city of Aalborg.

Obel contributed to Aalborg's prosperity in the 19th century by successfully developing his family's tobacco business, which was founded in 1787. On his mother's and stepfather's death in 1828, he took control of the factory, changing its name to C.W. Obel. Under Obel's leadership, the factory became the city's primary employer, a position it maintained for many years. From 1853 until his death in 1860, Obel was codirector of Aalborg Bys og Omegns Sparekasse, the local savings bank.
