= Ro's Torv =

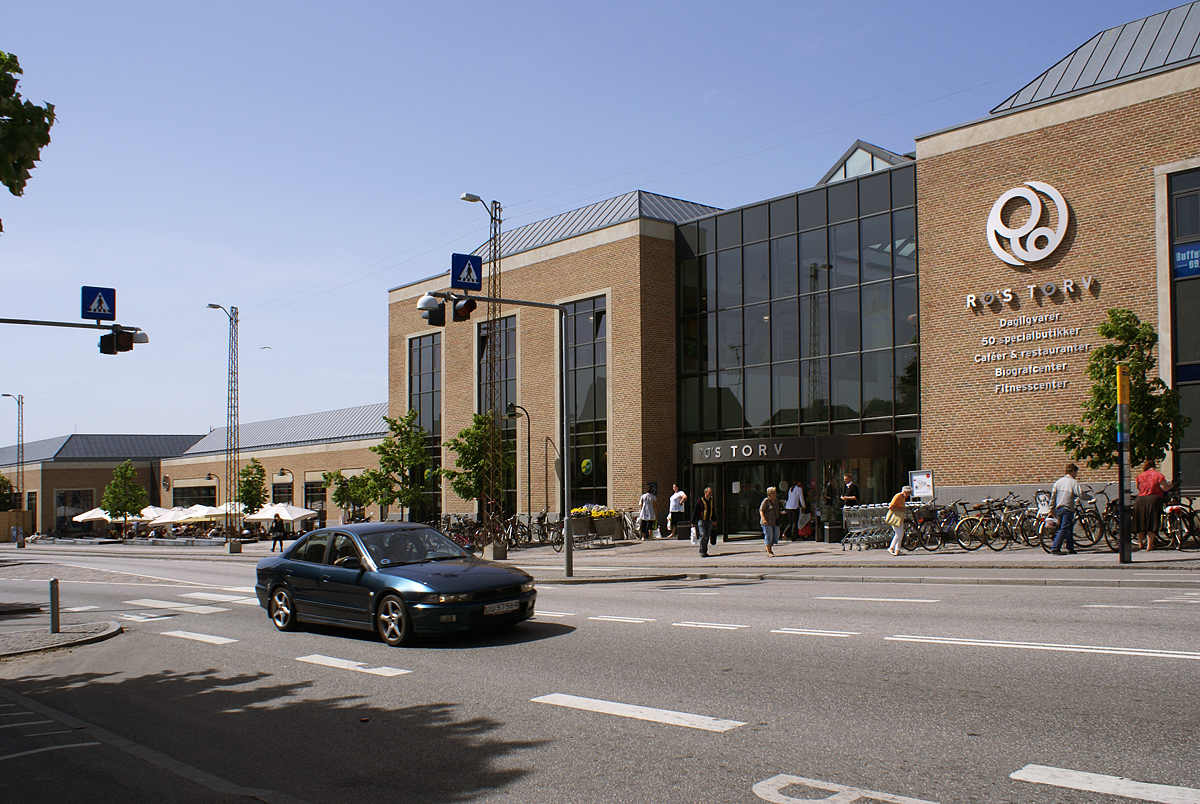
- Location: Roskilde, Denmark
- Coordinates: 55°38′29″N 12°6′04″E
- Opened: 2003
- Owner: DADES
- Architect: Claus B. Hansen
- Num. of stores: 86
- Floor area: 84,000 m^{2} (900,000 sq ft)
- Website: rostorv.dk

Ro's Torv is a shopping centre in central Roskilde, Denmark.

== History ==
Designed by Claus B. Hansen and built by the Keops property company, Ro's Torv was inaugurated in 2003. In 2006 Keops bought out Hansen and commenced an expansion before selling it to Essex Invest. In 2008, Ro's Torv was sold to DADES for DKK 1.5 billion. The expansion was completed in 2009, increasing the floor area from 40,000 m^{2} (430,000 sq ft) to 84,000 m^{2} (900,000 sq ft). The expansion was designed by AK83 Arkitekter while Keops was responsible for the construction.

== Facilities ==
Ro's Torv contains 60 shops and nine eateries. Other facilities include a cinema (Kino Ro's Torv) and a Fitness.dk fitness centre.

== See also ==
- Roskilde Congress & Sports Centre
