= Augustinus Fonden =

Danish foundation

- Founded: 1942
- Type: charity
- Purpose: Culture, science
- Location: Copenhagen, Denmark
- Region served: Denmark
- Website: www.augustinusfonden.dk

Augustinus Fonden (English: The Augustinus Foundation) is a Danish foundation based in Copenhagen, Denmark. It was created in 1942 by the owners of Chr. Augustinus Fabrikker, one of the three predecessor companies of Scandinavian Tobacco Group. Chr. Augustinus Fabrikker is now fully owned by the foundation and serves as a holding company of its investments.

== History ==
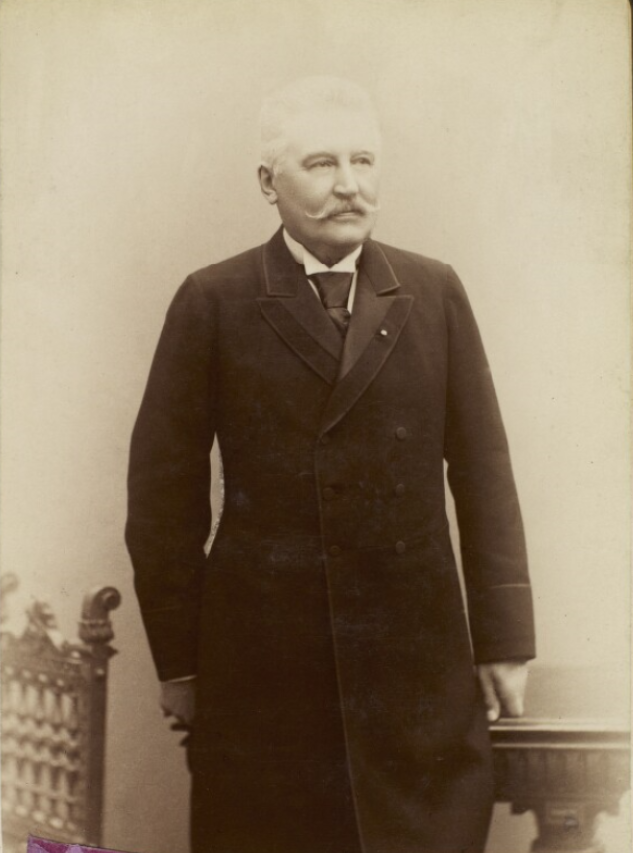
Ludvig Augustinus

Augustinus Fonden was established in 1942 by Chr. Augustinus Fabrikker A/S at the initiative of tobacco manufacturer Ludvig Augustinus (1888-1947), a descendant of Christian Augustinus who had founded the company on the island of Amager in 1750..

At the event of Lili Augustinus' death in 1998, controversy arose over the right to her 17,5% share of Chr. Augustinus Fabrikker A/S. The foundation ultimately ended up acquiring the remaining shares in the company from her two sons for DKK 500 million.

== Donations ==
The Augustinus Foundation has been a major contributor to the Louisiana Museum of Modern Art in Humlebæk north of Copenhagen, including to its expansions in 1979–84 and 1989–90. The Augustinus Foundation was also a driving force behind the establishment of the creation of the Experimentarium science centre in Hellerup in 1988 and the renovation of Det Ny Teater in Copenhagen in 1991.

In the 2000s, the foundation has contributed to the refurbishment of Tivoli Concert Hall, the construction of a new building for Moesgård Museum in Aarhus and Norman Foster's Elephant House in Copenhagen Zoo. The foundation has also supported the publication of Den Store Danske Encyklopædi, first in 1991 of the book edition and again in 2005 of a digitalized version.

The Augustinus Foundation is also a major supporter of classical music as well as restoration of churches.

== Chr. Augustinus Fabrikker ==
Subsidiaries

- Skandinavisk Holding A/S (65%)
  - Scandinavian Tobacco Group (51%)
  - Fritz Hansen
  - Tivoli A/S (31%)
- CAF Invest A/S (100%)
- Tivoli A/S (25%)
- Skodsborg Sundpark A/S (100%)
- Rungsted Sundpark A/S (100%)
- Skodsborg Sundhedscenter (100%)
  - Skodsborg Spa Hotel (100%)

Associated companies

- Jeudan A/S (41%)
- Gyldendal (28%)

Other investments

- Ambu A/S
- Solar A/S
- Kristeligt Dagblad
- Royal Unibrew
- Monberg & Thorsen

== See also ==
- C.W. Obel
