= DADES =

Danish property investment company

- Company type: Private
- Industry: Property
- Founded: 1937
- Founder: Ejnar Danielsen
- Headquarters: Kongens Lyngby, Copenhagen, Denmark
- Area served: Denmark
- Key people: Søren Kristiansen (CEO), Peter Andreassen (Chairman)
- Website: www.dades.dk

DADES (Det Almindelige Danske Ejendomsselskab) is one of the largest private property investment companies in Denmark. Shopping centres account for just over half of its portfolio, making it the second largest owner of shopping centres in the country. The company is headquartered in Kongens Lyngby in the northern suburbs of Copenhagen.

== History ==
The company was founded by in 1937 by Ejnar Danielsen with money from the sale of his share of a seed company in Nakskov. His first acquisition was the so-called Champaign House on Grønningen in Copenhagen. At the time of his death in 1980, he had acquired some 70 properties. Initially the company focused exclusively on residential properties but from 1968 it also invested in commercial property and the first shopping centre was acquired in 1993. The company grew to become the largest privately owned real estate company in Denmark but was referred to the second place by Jeudan in October 2014.

== Ownership ==
Ejnar Danielsens Fond, a foundation established by Ejnar Danielsen in 1975, owns 47.3 % of the company. In 1993, part of the company was sold to a group of institutional investors. In 2015, it was announced that Novo A/S (with 37 %) and Tryghedsgruppen (with 12.3 %) had acquired a total of 49.2 % of the shares in the company from Realdania, LD, Nykredit, Alm. Brand, Bevica Fonden, Danske Bank and the pension funds ISP and JØP.

== Portfolio ==
DADES owns a portfolio of properties with a market value of DKK 16.9 (1 January 2015).

=== Shopping centres ===
Greater Copenhagen

- Ballerup Centret, Ballerup
- Egedal Centret, Stenløse
- Hørsholm Midtpunkt, Hørsholm
- Farum Bytorv, Farum
- Ølby Torvecenter, Køge
- Ro's Torv, Roskilde
- Spinderiet, Valby, Copenhagen
- Waterfront Shopping, Tuborg Havn, Hellerup, Copenhagen
- WAVES, Greve

Jutland

- Nørreport Centret, Holstebro
- Sct. Mathias Centret, Viborg
- Viby Centret, Viby J, Aarhus

== DATEA ==
The wholly owned subsidiary DATEA is one of Denmark's largest property and facility management companies.
