= Jeudan =

- Company type: A/s
- Industry: Property
- Founded: 1898
- Headquarters: Copenhagen, Denmark
- Area served: Denmark
- Key people: Per Wetke Hallgren (CEO), Jørgen Tandrup (Chairman)
- Website: www.jeudan.dk

Jeudan is the largest listed real estate company in Denmark. It is the largest private real estate investment company in the country and its activities also comprise property and facility management. The company is headquartered in Prince William Mansion in Copenhagen.

== History ==
The company was founded in 1898. It was later owned by the founder's grandson Jens Erik Udsen. In 1999, jeuDAN merged with Ejendomsselskabet EEC under the name Jeudan. In 2000, Jeudan acquired a 27.5 % share of Ejendomsselskabet Norden with the intention of merging the two companies but all shares was instead sold to a group of Danish pension funds. In 2009, Jeudan acquired Landic Properties Denmark (formerly Atlas Ehendomme) for DKK 2 billion.

In 2013, Idsen sold his remaining share of the company to Chr. Augustinus Fabrikker. In October 2014, it took over the position as the largest real estate investment company in Denmark from DADES.

== Ownership ==
As of January 2014, William Demant Invest owned 41.6 % and Chr. Augustinus Fabrikker owned 29.9 % of the shares in the company and Nesdu and the company's owner, Jens Erik Udsen, owned an 11 % share.

== Portfolio ==
Jeudan owns Københavns Torvehaller, the covered market on Israels Plads in Copenhagen.
