= Obel House =

Building in Copenhagen, Denmark

- Obels Gård
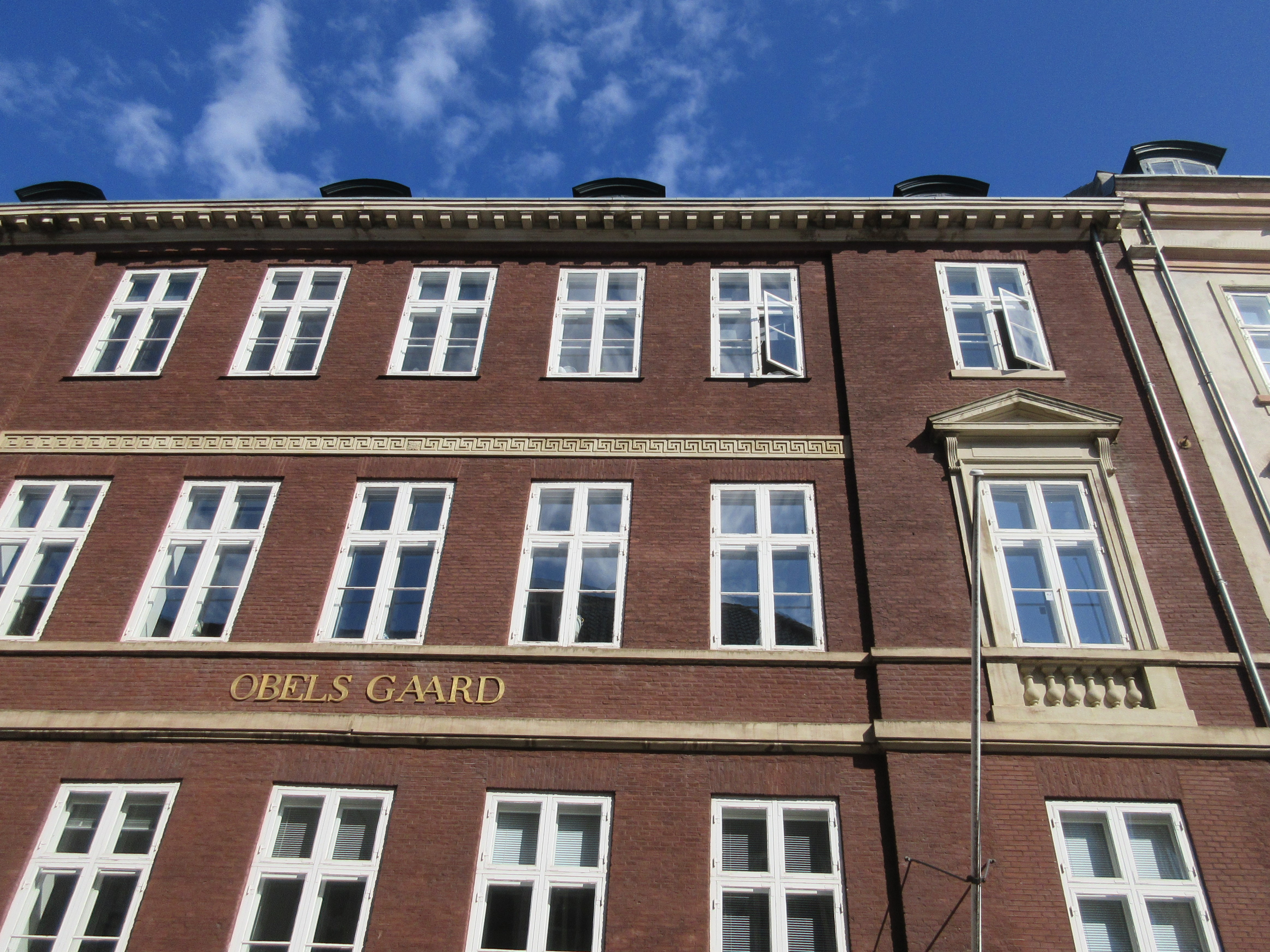
- Thott Mansion seen from the square
- Interactive map of the Obel House area

General information
- Architectural style: Neoclassical
- Location: Copenhagen, Denmark
- Coordinates: 55°40′1.27″N 12°34′16.36″E
- Completed: 1797

The Obel House (Danish: Obels Gård) is a Neoclassical property located at Vestergade 2 in the Latin Quarter of Copenhagen, Denmark. It was listed on the Danish registry of protected buildings and places in 1918.

== History ==
=== 18th century ===
The first known owner of the property is Lasse Kruse who owned it in 1277. Councilman Svend Pedersen rented it out to a vicar from Falster in 1397. It had by 1416 passed into the ownership of Maribo Abbey.

The property was from at least the middle of the 16th century operated as a guesthouse under the name Sjælland ("Zealand"). Sjælland was in 1652 owned by councilman and German Chancellery secretary Bartholomæus Pedersen Hanstein. In Copenhagen's first cadastre of 1689, the property was listed as No. 8. Hanstein's widow, Maren Hanstein, sold the guesthouse to Mads Lauridsen Lieme. It was destroyed by fire in the Copenhagen Fire of 1728.

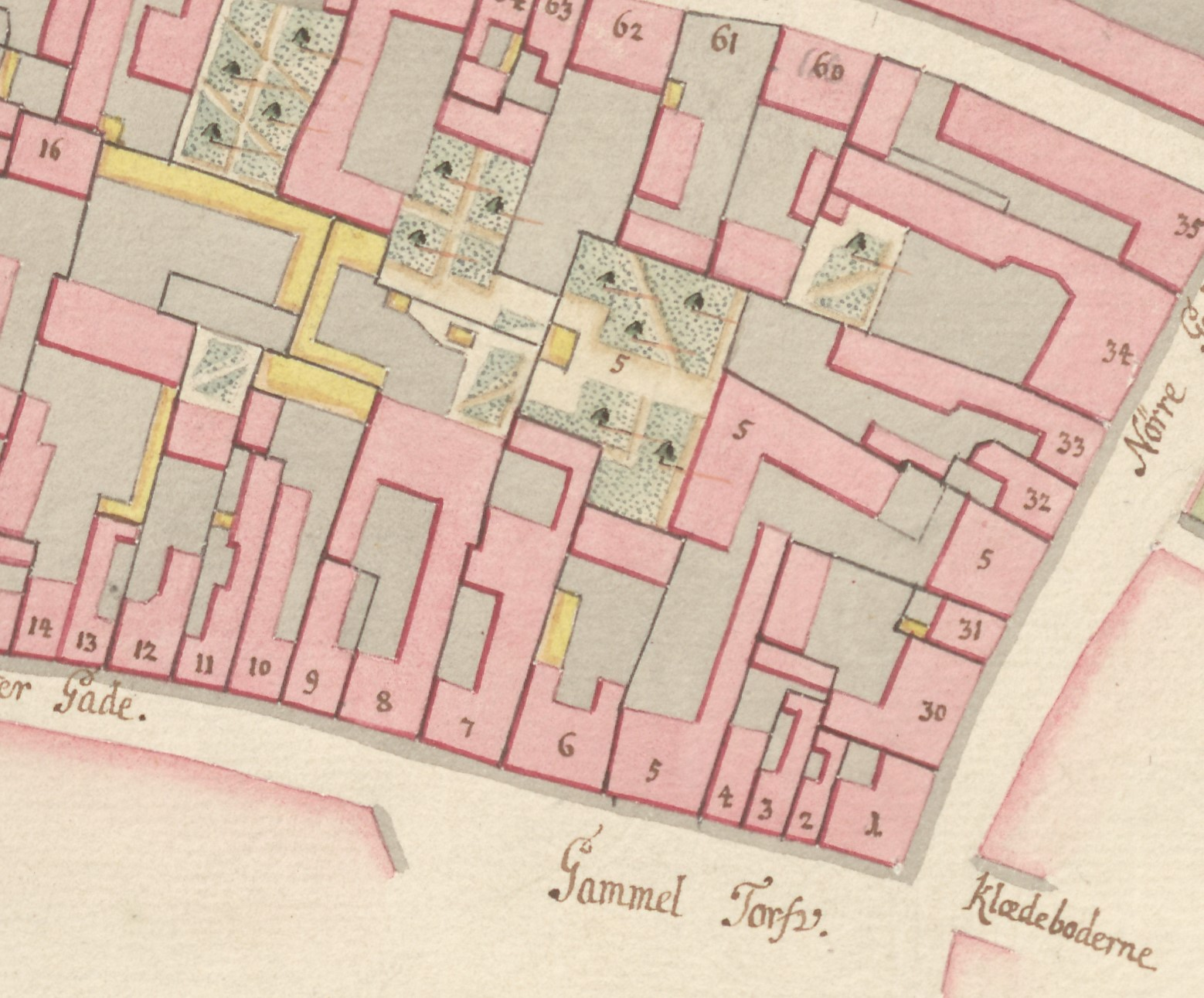
No. 8 and No. 9 seen on a detail from Gedde's district map of Northern Quarter, 1757.

The property was later divided into two properties. In the new cadastre of 1756, they were listed as No. 7 and No. 9. The properties were both owned by Christen Christensen Borup.

At the time of the 1787 census, No. 8/9 was home to three households. Ole Køhling, a brewer, resided in the building with his wife Sørine Margrete Holt, two brewery workers and two maids. Jobst Mathias v.Reick, a retired justitsråd, resided in another dwelling with his six-year-old son, his brother and two sisters and two maids. Kield Hiorth, a 76-year-old unmarried pensioner, resided in the building with his 32-year-old niece Lovise Biørens Datter, a housekeeper and a maid.

The building was again destroyed in the Copenhagen Fire of 1795. The present building on the site was constructed in 1796-1797 for councilman Herman Læssøe.

=== 19th century ===
At the time of the 1801 census, No. 7&9 was home to four households. Johan Traugott Otto, a surgeon, resided in the building with his wife Albertine Wilhelmine (née Conradi), their three children (aged one to seven), two brewery workers, a caretaker, a male servant, a female cook and two maids. One of the three children was the later physician Carl Otto. Johannes Outzen, a General War Commissioner, resided in the building with his wife Anne Joachimine Outzen, their 15-year-old foster daughter Anne Henrichsen, a male servant, a female cook and a maid. Jean Agier, a merchant (grosserer), resided in the building with his wife Charlotte Severine Agier, their three children (aged two to five), a caretaker, a nanny, a female cook and a maid. Peder Borgaard, a hosier (Hosekræmmer), resided in the building with his two-year-old son, two employees, a housekeeper, a female cook, a maid and a lodger.

In the new cadastre of 1806, the property was listed as No. 7. It was by then owned by a brewer named Jacobsen.

At the time of the 1840 census, No. 7 was home to one household on each floor in the front wing and a hotel in the rear wing. Jens Rasmussen, a merchant, resided on the ground floor with his wife Caroline Lovise (née Rasmussen), their two children (aged three and 15), one male servant and two maids. Carl Ludvig Møller, a theologian (lecturer), resided on the first floor with his wife Vilhelmine Livetzau, one male servant and two maids. Ole Carl Bleckingberg, a Supreme Court attorney, resided on the second floor with his wife Vibekke Dorthea Garde, their three children (aged 13 to 15), one male servant and two maids. Anders Petersen, a barkeeper, resided in the basement with his wife Anne Kirstine født Petersen, a servant and a workman. The guesthouse in the courtyard was managed by the widow Anne Cathrine Adolphsen (née Hansen). She lived there with her daughter Anne Cathrine Adolphsen, a pharmacy student, a carpenter's apprentice, two workmen, a merchant, four male servants and four maids.

At the time of the 1845 census, No. 7 was again home to one household on each floor in the front wing and a hotel in the rear wing. Hans Georg Bentsen, a member of the Danish Chancery, resided on the ground floor withhis wife Thor Johs. Bentsen, L. Cathrine Ørsted and one maid. Carl Ludvig Müller, inspector of the Royal Coin Cabinet, resided on the first floor with his wife Eleonore Vilhelmine Frederikke Gregersine Müller, their four children (aged one to five), a male servant, three maids, a wet nurse and the lodger Hans Wegge (a surveyor). Otto Carl Blechingberg still resided on the second floor with his wife Wibeke Dorothea Blechingberg (née Garde), their two children (aged 11 and 20), a male servant and two maids. Anders Petersen Langaae, the proprietor of a tavern in the basement, resided in the associated dwelling with his wife Ane Kirstine Peders Datter and four servants (two male and two female). Anne Cathrine Adolph, the innkeeper, resided in the hotel wing with three female and five male employees.

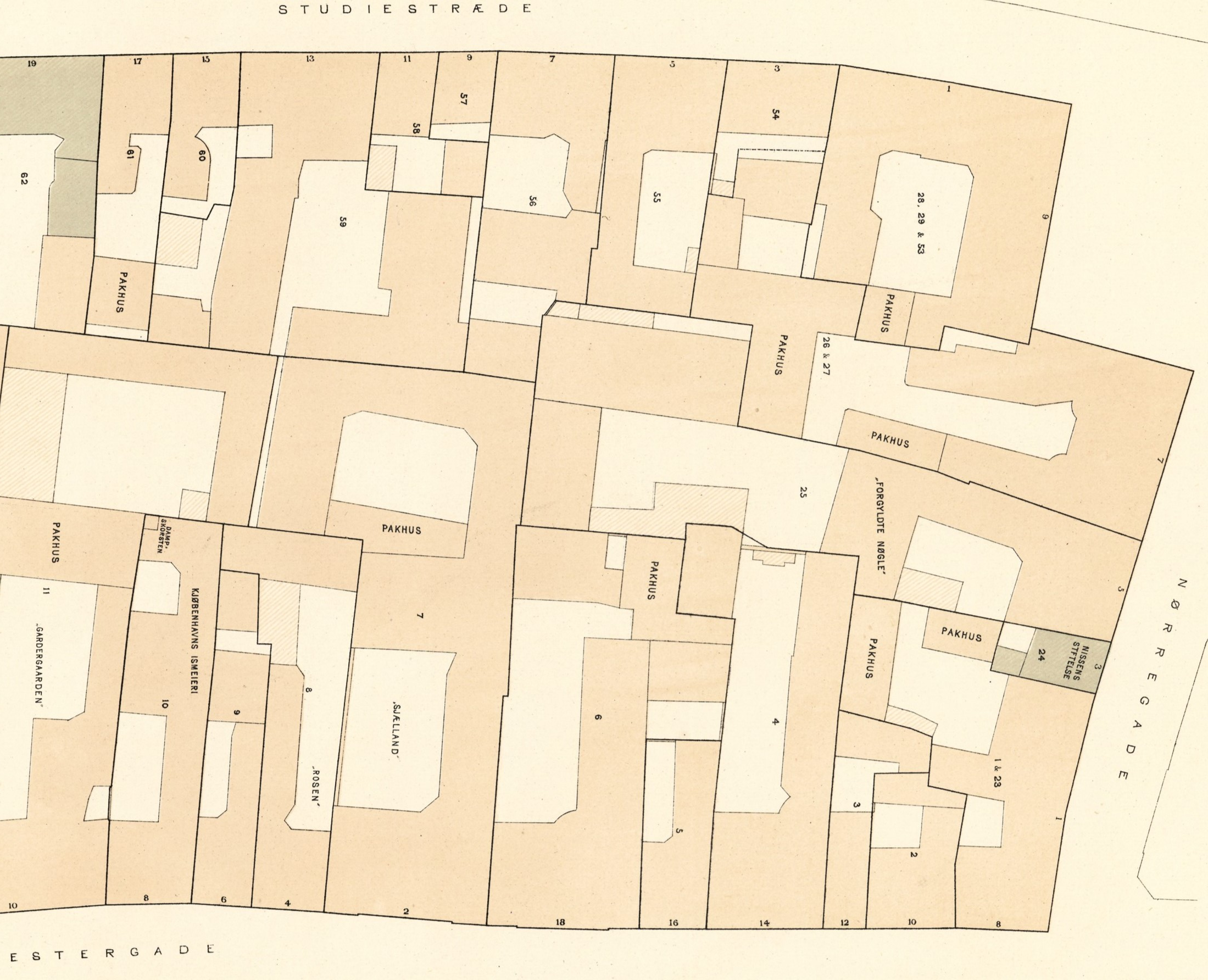
The property seen on a detail from one of Berggreen's black plans of Northern Quarter, 1886-88.

At the time of the 1860 census, Otto Carl Blechingbergwas still residing in one of the apartments with his wife, an unmarried daughter, a male servant and two maids. Christian Michael Winther ( 1817-1890), another lawyer (overprokurator), resided in another apartment with his wife Frederikke Marie Henriette Winther, their five children (aged two to nine), his 75-year-old aunt Jacobine Caroline Berg and four maids. Wilhelm Christian Emil Thulsen, a merchant (grosserer), resided in the third apartment with his wife Louise Cecilie Petrea Thulsen, their five children (aged one to nine) and four maids. Christian Frederik Nørager, a book printer, was now based in the rear wing. He lived there with his employee Frederik Carl Albøge and two maids. The rest of the rear wing was still operated as a guesthouse.

=== 20th century ===
An engineer named Kampmann was among the residents of the building in 1919. He was one of relatively few car owners in the street at that time.

== Architecture ==
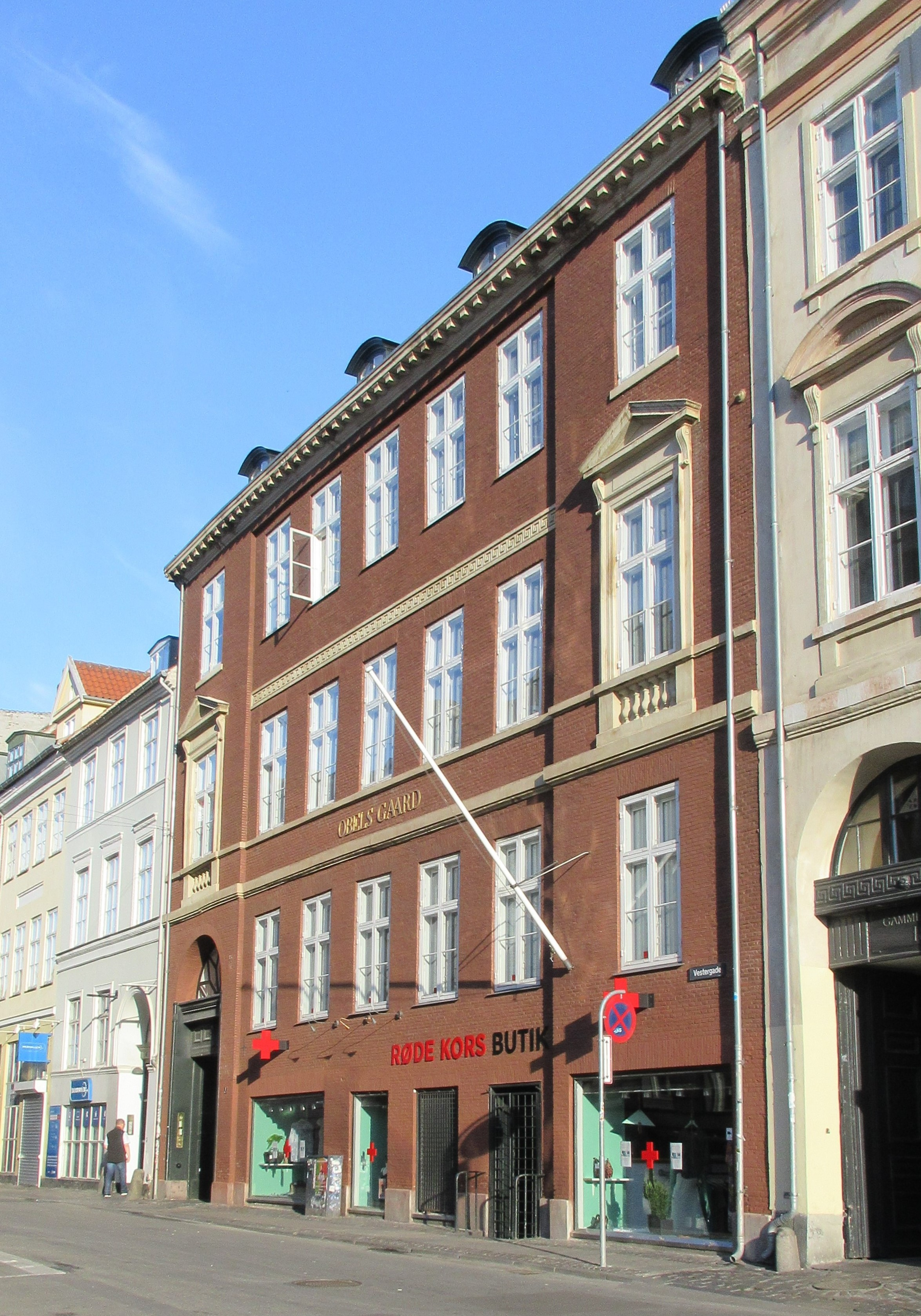
The Obel House

The Obel House is constructed in red brick with three floors over a raised cellar. It is seven bays wide of which the two, slightly projecting outer bays are wider than the five central ones. The two outer windows on the first floor have balusters and are topped by triangular pediments. The facade is finished by a dentilated cornice.

== Today ==
The property is today owned by C.W. Obel Ejendomme A/S.
