= Vestergade, Copenhagen =

Street in central Copenhagen, Denmark

Vestergade
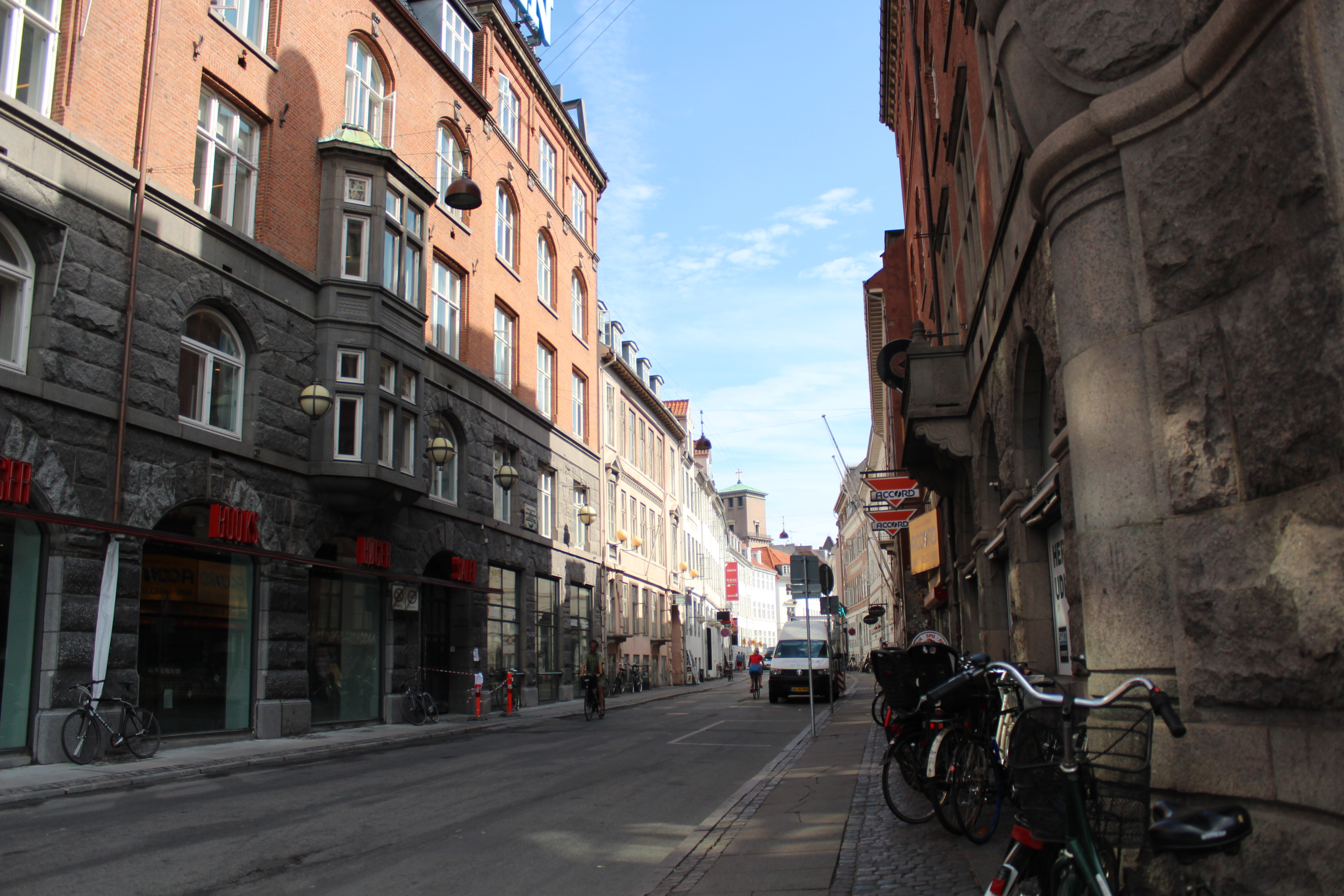
- Interactive map of Vestergade
- Length: 235 m (771 ft)
- Location: Copenhagen, Denmark
- Quarter: City centre
- Postal code: 1456
- Nearest metro station: Rådhuspladsen
- Coordinates: 55°40′38.25″N 12°34′10.57″E
- Northeast end: Gammeltorv
- Southwest end: City Hall Square

Vestergade (lit. "West Street") is a street in central Copenhagen, Denmark, linking Gammeltorv in the northeast with the City Hall Square in the southwest. The street defines the southern boundary of Copenhagen's Latin Quarter. Most of the buildings in the street date from the years after the Copenhagen Fire of 1795.

== History ==
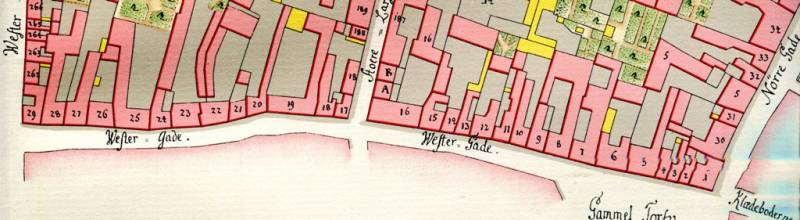
Vestergadeas seen on Gedde's maps of Copenhagen from 1757

The name Vestergade ("West Street") testifies Gammeltorv's original status as the most important square in Copenhagen. In the Middle Ages, Vestergade was Copenhagen's main street, linking the square with the Western City Gate at its western end. The north side of the street was lined with guesthouses. The city gate was moved a little further to the south in 1668 but Vestergade maintained its role as the principal entrance road for traffic coming from the west. The street was completely destroyed in the Copenhagen Fire of 1728 and again in the Fire of 1795.

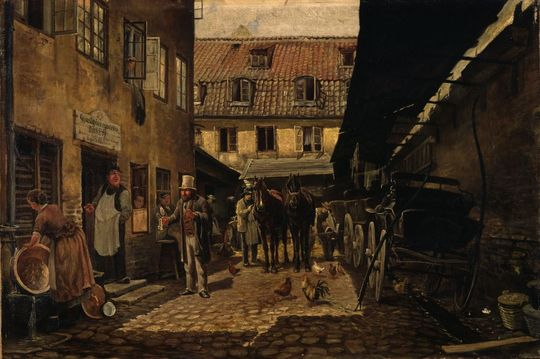
The courtyard of the inn "The Rose" at No. 4, painting by Theodor Philipsen

In 1865, Vestergade was home to a total of 17 inns and guesthouses. The number then began to decline, both as a result of the decommissioning of the city's fortifications, the increased importance of the railway and the large and modern hotels that opened on Vester Voldgade in the 1880s. In 1877, nine inns were left in the street and in 1888 the number had dropped to seven: Sjælland ("Zealand"), Rosen ("The Rose"), Vinhuset ("The Wine House"), Tre Hjorter ("Three Deer"), Garvergården ("The Tannery"), Gardergården ("The (Royal) Guards' House") and Kronen ("The Crown"). In 1894 the number was down to five and by 1929 only Tre Hjorter was left.

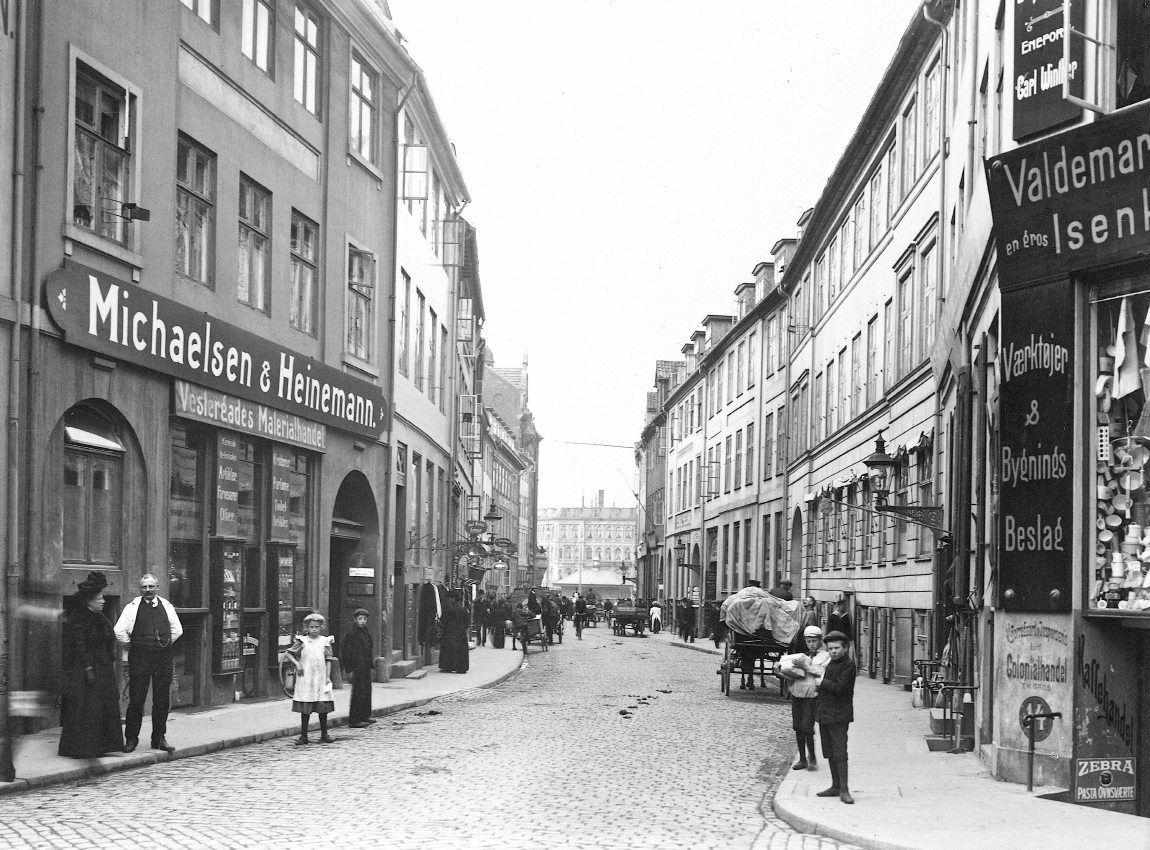
Vestergade photographed by Johannes Hauerslev in 1909

Both in the 1930s, 1940s and 1950s, it was proposed to widen the street and make it more straight but each time it was stopped by opposition from citizens and organisations.

== Notable buildings and structures ==
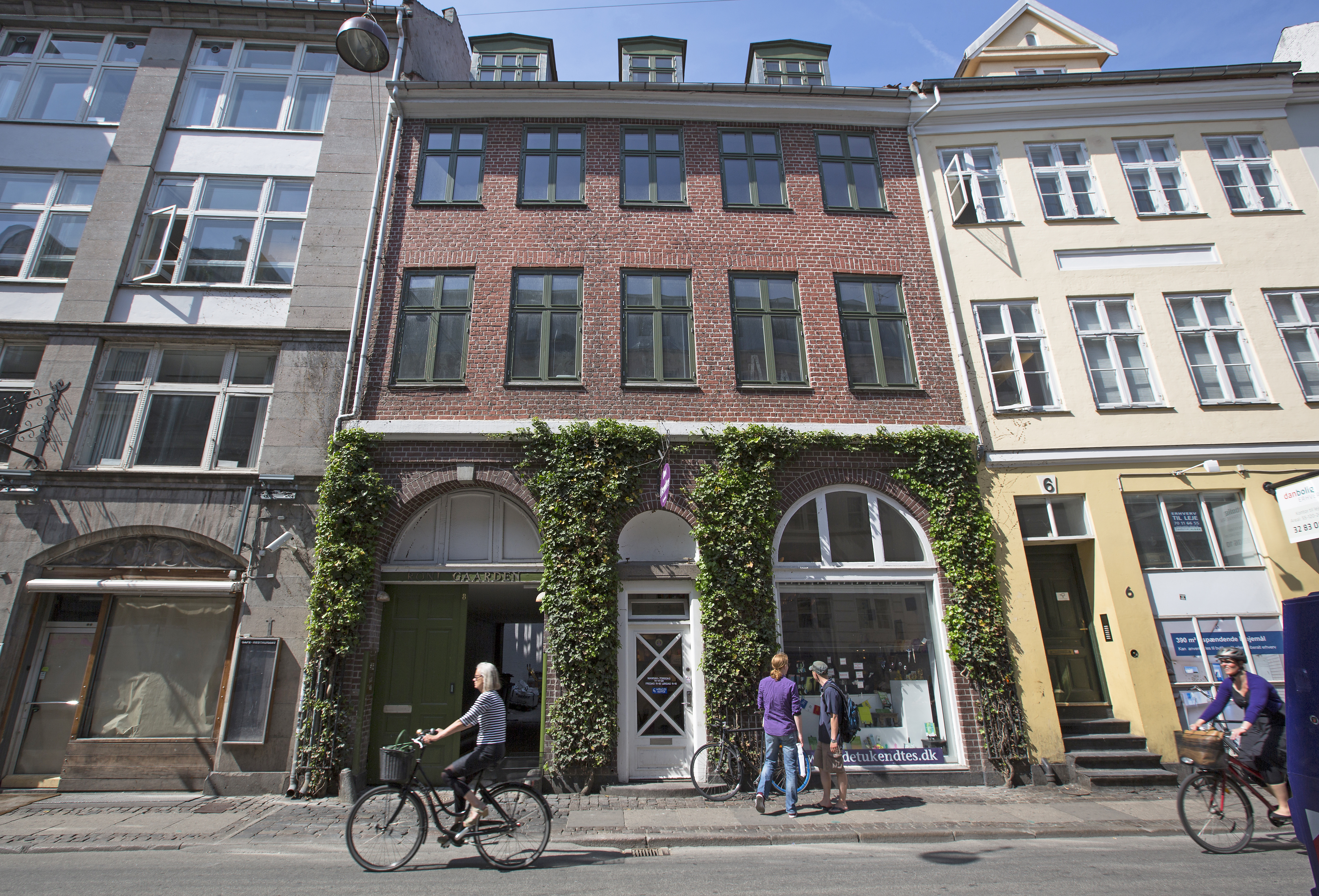
Vestergade 8

DIS - Study Abroad in Scandinavia is based at No. 7.

No. 12 is the former guesthouse Tre Hjorter ("Three Deer"). Gardergården at No. 18 is another former guesthouse. It received its current name when it was rented out to the Royal Horse Guards . The complex had room for 77 and was replaced by the new Royal Horse Guards Barracks at Frederiksholms Kanal in 1792 when it had become too small. The buildings were then again used as a guesthouse until the late 19th century. 14-year-old Hans Christian Andersen stayed the first couple of weeks at Gardergården when he first arrived in Copenhagen.

The Metropol department store (Vestergade 9/Kattesundet 3/Frederiksberggade 16) was built in 1906–08 to design by Anton Rosen. In 1924, the Jugendstil building was converted into a theatre by Viggo Jacobsen and Albert Oppenheim.

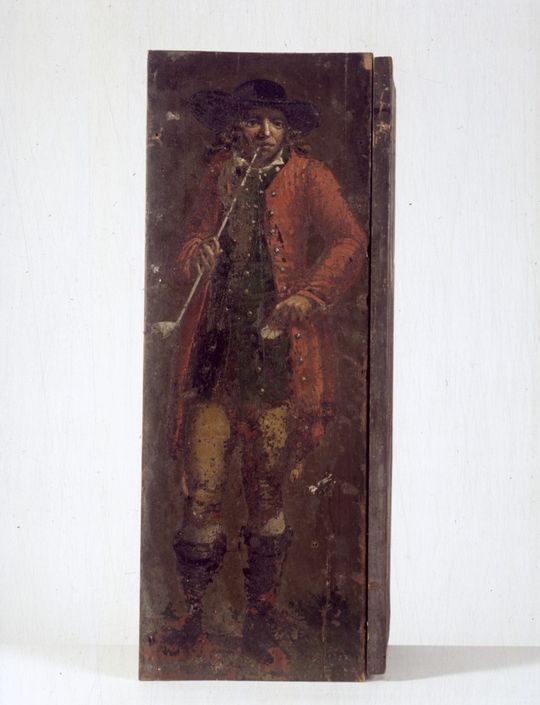
Painted shutter from Vestergade 5: A farmer smoking a clay pipe

The C. W Obel House at No. 2 was built as a combined inn and brewery in 1797. The property was acquired by the C.W. Obel tobacco manufacturing company in 1937. The company commissioned Frits Schlegel to design a five-storey warehouse and office building in the courtyard. The company, now the investment company of the C. W. Obel Family Foundation, is still based in the building. No. 5, which is also from the 1790s, was built for another leading tobacco manufacturer, Christian Augustinus, whose company was later merged with C. W. Obel.

Politikens Hus (Vestergade 28/Rådhuspladsen 37) is the headquarters of the newspaper Politiken. The building is from 1896 and was designed by Philip Smidth. The building on the opposite corner (Vestergade 37 / Rådhuspladsen 45-47 / Frederiksberggade 40 ) is the former Hotel Bristol, now also known as Absalons Gård.

== Public art and memorials ==
On Vestergade 22 is a plaque commemorating Adam Oehlenschläger. His sister lived at the site. She was married to Hans Christian Ørsted and their home on the first floor was used as a venue for literary salons.

== Transport ==
The Rådhuspladsen City Circle Line station is located at the southwestern end of the street.

== Cultural references ==
- Vestergade features prominently in Ludvig Holberg's comedy Ellevte jun (1723) and Yre Hjorter is also mentioned in his comedy Ulysses von Ithacia.
- The street is also featured as one of the two eponymous streets in Thomas Overskou's comedy Østergade and Vestergade-
- Tom Kristensen's Expressionist poem Vestergade 1924 the chaotic street, with its horses, carriages and sounds, is described as experienced by a narrator who has just fallen on his bicycle.

== See also ==
- Ny Vestergade
