= Scandinavian Tobacco Group =

Cigar manufacturer

Scandinavian Tobacco Group A/S
- Company type: Publicly traded
- Traded as: Nasdaq Copenhagen STG
- ISIN: DK0060696300
- Industry: Tobacco
- Founded: 1961 (as Skandinavisk Tobakskompagni A/S)
- Headquarters: Copenhagen, Denmark
- Key people: Niels Frederiksen (CEO)
- Products: Cigars, pipe tobacco
- Number of employees: Approx. 8,100
- Website: www.st-group.com

Scandinavian Tobacco Group is a manufacturer of cigars and traditional pipe tobacco. The city company is headquartered in Copenhagen, Denmark, and is a publicly listed company on Nasdaq Copenhagen.

== History ==
The company can trace its origin back a couple of hundred years while the modern company was founded in 1961 as Skandinavisk Tobakskompagni A/S by a merger of the tobacco activities of the Danish companies Chr. Augustine Fabrikker, C.W. Obel and R. Færch's Factories.

A reconstruction of the company in 1990 put all cigarette manufacturing in the subsidiary company House of Prince A/S and all cigar manufacturing in Nobel Cigars A/S.

In February 2008, the cigarette and snus operations of the company were acquired by British American Tobacco. The company retained its cigar, pipe tobacco, fine-cut tobacco businesses.

In December 2008, the company's name changed to Scandinavian Tobacco Group AB.

On 26 April 2010, an agreement was signed to form a new company (Scandinavian Tobacco Group A/S) by combining all the tobacco business of Scandinavian Tobacco Group AB with the cigars and pipe tobacco business of Swedish Match AB, including the US-based subsidiaries General Cigar and Cigars International.

=== Mergers and acquisitions ===
In 2011, Scandinavian Tobacco Group acquired Lane Limited, a US-based manufacturer and brand owner of pipe-tobacco, fine-cut tobacco and machine-made cigars, from Reynolds American Inc. Through the acquisition of Lane, the company gained ownership of Captain Black (pipe tobacco and cigar), Bugler (fine-cut tobacco), Winchester (cigars) and other smaller brands.

In 2013, the company acquired the catalog and online retail business PipesandCigars.com. In 2014, followed the acquisition of Verellen, a Belgian brand owner and manufacturer of machine-made cigars and Torano, a handmade cigar brand.

In 2018, Scandinavian Tobacco Group acquired Thompson Cigar, a leading US online cigar retailer. In 2019, the company acquired Peterson Pipe Tobacco, the pipe tobacco business of Kapp and Peterson Limited an Irish pipe and pipe tobacco manufacturer. The same year, the company announced the acquisition of Royal Agio Cigars, a leading European producer of cigars and cigarillos. The acquisition was finalised in January 2020.

Agio acquisition

On 2 January, Scandinavian Tobacco Group completed the acquisition of Agio Cigars, a cigar company based in the Netherlands.

Public listing

On 10 February 2016, Scandinavian Tobacco Group became a public listed company on the NASDAQ Copenhagen Stock Exchange. 40% of the share capital was sold to new shareholders, while Skandinavisk Holding II A/S and Swedish Match Cigars Holding AB continued as major shareholders of Scandinavian Tobacco Group.
