= Bryant and May Factory =

Bryant and May Factory may refer to:

- Bow Quarter, formerly Bryant and May Factory, Bow
- Bryant and May Factory, Melbourne

== See also ==
- Bryant & May
