= Chips, Manchester =

Apartment building in Manchester, England

Chips
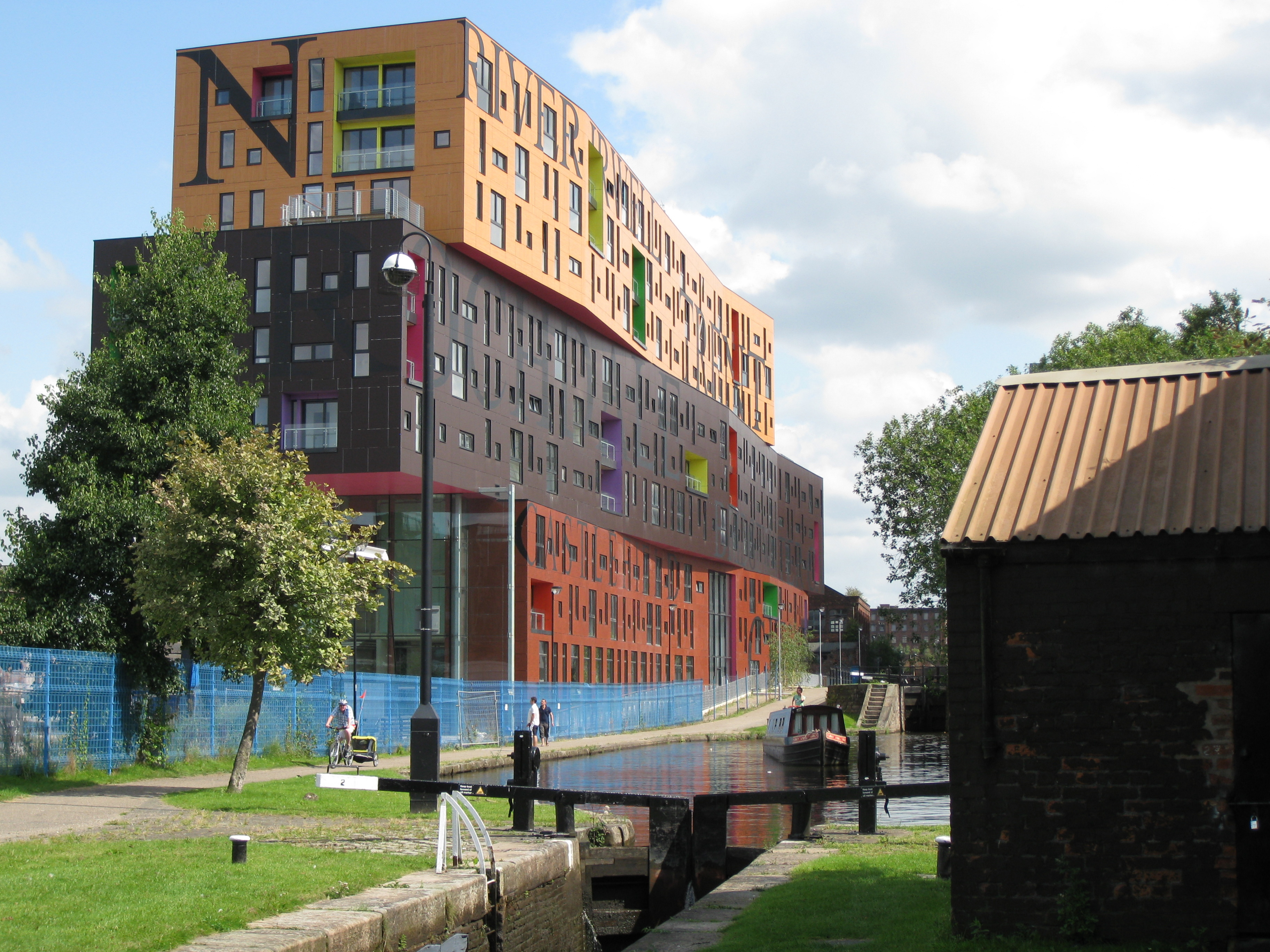
- Chips, Manchester

General information
- Status: Completed
- Type: Residential
- Architectural style: Postmodern
- Location: New Islington, Manchester, England
- Coordinates: 53.4815°N 2.2206°W
- Completed: 2009
- Owner: Urban Splash

Technical details
- Floor count: 8

Design and construction
- Architect: Will Alsop

Chips is a residential apartment building, alongside the Ashton Canal, in New Islington, Manchester, England. Historically part of Ancoats, the building is part of an urban renewal project, New Islington Millennium Village in east Manchester which has been led by Urban Splash.

Chips is a nine-storey building and was designed by the architect Will Alsop, founder of Alsop Architects. The structural engineers were Civic Engineers. Tom Bloxham of Urban Splash requested that the building be away from "mundanity", and came up with Chips with Alsop.

In January 2018, Chips failed a Greater Manchester Fire and Rescue Service risk assessment and the cladding on the building was found to have "non fire retardant" written on it.

== Background ==
Chips is part of the New Islington regeneration project east of Manchester city centre.
