= Swan Vesta =

Brand of matches

Swan Vestas is a brand of matches. Shorter than normal pocket matches, they are particularly popular with smokers and have long used the tagline "the smoker's match", although this has been replaced by the prefix "the original" on the current packaging. Until 2018 they were "strike-anywhere" matches, but in response to a change in EU regulations banning the necessary chemicals Swan Vestas were changed to be safety matches.

Swan Vestas matches are manufactured under the House of Swan brand, which is also responsible for making other smoking accessories such as cigarette papers, flints and filter tips. The matches are manufactured by Swedish Match in Sweden using local, sustainably grown aspen.

== History ==
The Swan brand began in 1883 when the Collard & Kendall match company in Bootle on Merseyside near Liverpool introduced 'Swan wax matches'. These were superseded by later versions including 'Swan White Pine Vestas' from the Diamond Match Company. These were formed of a wooden splint soaked in wax. They were finally christened 'Swan Vestas' in 1906 when Diamond merged with Bryant and May and the company enthusiastically promoted the Swan brand. By the 1930s Swan Vestas had become 'Britain's best-selling match'. The brand is now owned by the Swedish Match company. In 1994, Bryant & May, in Liverpool, closed.

== In popular culture ==
- "vestas", without the capital, appear in Arthur Conan Doyle's Sherlock Holmes short story "The Adventure of Silver Blaze" (1892), and finding a half-burned one is one of the clues that helps solve the crime. They also appear in the story "The Man with the Twisted Lip", as the professional beggar Hugh Boone pretends "a small trade in wax vestas" to avoid the police. In both of these stories, "vesta" is used as a generic term for "match".
- Swan Vestas make an appearance in Act 2, Scene 2 of Albert Herring, Benjamin Briten's 1948 opera. The eponymous protagonist fumbles around trying to light a gas mantle with the matches. He takes so long that a small explosion takes place: "Dangerous stuff, gas", says Albert.
- The discovery of "an odd vesta or two" made it possible for Richard Hannay to escape confinement in John Buchan's novel The Thirty-Nine Steps.
- In John le Carré's Smiley's People, a box of Swan Vestas is found in General Vladimir's pocket after his murder. That fact later reminds Smiley that Vladimir was a heavy smoker, which leads him to an important discovery.
- They are mentioned in Mark Z. Danielewski's House of Leaves on p. 466 as a personal item that Navidson decides to bring with him into the house.
- Swan Vestas matches are used as an instrument in the off-Broadway and touring productions of Stomp, with the actors alternating between shaking and striking full boxes of matches—with the striker heads removed—to create a musical number.
- A Vesta is described by Hamm in his soliloquy about the last man on earth in Beckett's Endgame as being used to light his pipe: "I calmly filled my pipe—the meerschaum, lit it with... let us say a vesta, drew a few puffs. Aah!"
- In the game The Last Express, the protagonist, Robert Cath, carries a box of Vestas, the usage of which can affect certain events.
- A box of Swan Vestas were found among the belongings of George Mallory, who died on Mt. Everest in 1924. This find was depicted in the 2000 documentary Lost on Everest: The Search for Mallory & Irvine.
- A box of Swan Vestas were used by Yoko Ono in The Beatles: Get Back.
- "Swan Vestas" are used repeatedly by the protagonist in Len Deighton's Funeral in Berlin.
- In "Only Fools and Horses" Series 5, Episode 4, Rodney's "sunburn" and white suit are referred to by Del-Boy as "it makes him look like a "Swan Vesta".
- In Alan Moore's Swamp Thing #48 (1986), John Constantine remarks "...good old Swan Vestas. British matches, never let you down...".
