= North Point Global =

North Point Global Ltd. (NPG) was a Liverpool based real estate developer. With a head office in Edward pavilion (Salthouse quay), it was established in 2015 primarily to develop one of the regions around Liverpool's docks off Great George street. However, it filed for bankruptcy in 2018 leaving its Chinese investors in the lurch.

== New Chinatown development (Liverpool) ==
Though the group had not completed any housing project in the UK, it announced plans in December 2015 to develop a so-called "New Chinatown" near Liverpool docks for £200m, consisting of glitzy glass buildings and sky scrapers, a hotel, a business center and 280 homes. The development was planned over three sites - two owned by the Liverpool City Council and a third site owned by Urban Splash under the Tribeca scheme. It marketed these houses to middle class individual buyers and investors in Hong Kong and tier 1 cities of China in expo exhibitions, advertising guaranteed returns. The first phase of the project was promised to be completed in 2017 and the entire project completed by 2019. In an interview in July 2016, its chairman David Choules told reporters that 46 of its 127 residential units had already been sold by July 2016, with most of the shops on leaseholds. Its commercial spaces were built to allow small investors from China to take advantage of the Tier 1 entrepreneur's visa programme. Most investors consisted of individual families who had paid £40,000 each as 30% downpayment for their apartment. Some prospective investors paid up to 50% of their share upfront as a deposit. The site is currently being demolished and awaiting designs for a new development.

However, other than the inauguration program in 2016, no development took place at the site. The NPG group sold the development rights in 2017 to another shell company called "Your Housing Group". At around the same time, Bilt Group, the subcontractor who was planned to carry out its construction developed financial problems and was closed down.

In February 2018, Bloomberg reported that North Points projects had been stalled and put up for sale, leaving hundreds of Hong Kong and Chinese purchasers in the lurch. In 2018, the Liverpool Echo reported that construction had still not started at the site which was now filled with garbage and infested with rats.

== Other developments in Liverpool and Manchester ==
As of October 2017, five projects of North Point in Liverpool were suspended due to a paucity of funds and financial problems, without any repayments to investors. These were new China Town, Baltic house, North Point Pall mall, The Paramount and The Quadrant. Some in the press suspected the group to be involved in money laundering, but this was never proven.

In March 2018, an exposé by The Guardian revealed that North point was just one of the many fraudulent real estate development schemes floated in the UK to lure in individual Chinese small investors. At least one of them was promoted by the ex chancellor George Osborne. One was Pinnacle Angelgate, the company behind the Angelgate project in Manchester, went into administration in 2017. It was a sister company of North point global. Many of the proposed 344 apartments in that project were also sold off-plan to Chinese and Hong Kong investors, who paid deposits of more than £31m to secure the properties.
