= Mersey Match Factory =

Former match factory in Garston, Merseyside, England

Coordinates: 53.3505°N 2.8861°W

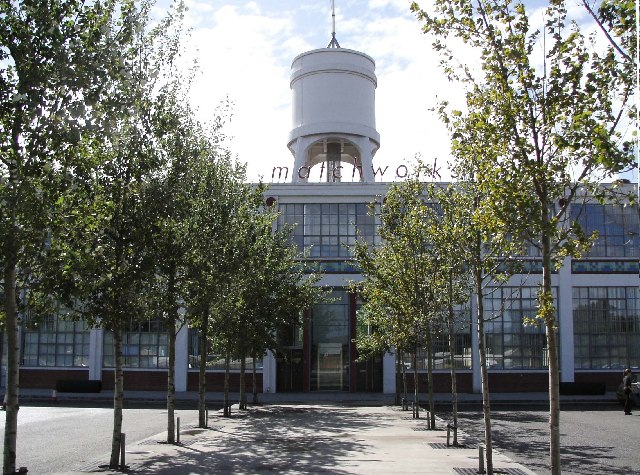
The former Mersey Match Factory

The Mersey Match Factory, later known as The Matchworks, is a former match factory on Speke Road, Garston, Liverpool, England. The factory closed in 1994, and has since been converted into offices and workshops. It had opened in 1921, having been built for Maguire, Paterson and Palmer, and later used by Bryant and May. The factory was the first building in the United Kingdom to be constructed using the flat-slab concrete technique. It is recorded in the National Heritage List for England as a designated Grade II listed building.

== Early history ==
The factory was built between 1919 and 1921 for the match producing firm of Maguire, Paterson and Palmer. The company had been founded in 1898 by J. T. Maguire and his four sons, who had previously worked for the Diamond Match Works in Liverpool. By 1919 J. T. Maguire and two of the sons had died, and another son had retired, leaving only Alexander Maguire to run the company, (Note: Alexander Maguire had been knighted in 1918 for his work in promoting the White Phosphorus Matches Prohibition Act 1908 (8 Edw. 7. c. 42)) which then became Maguire, Paterson and Palmer. In 1923 it became part of Bryant and May. The factory was taken over by Swedish Match in 1987, but it closed on 21 December 1994.

Since 1999 work has been carried out on the former factory buildings by the developers Urban Splash with the architects ShedKM. The factory has been transformed into offices, with service pods added to the rear, and a new mezzanine floor has been inserted. The former service wing at the rear has been converted into offices and workshops, and the Neo-Georgian block between the factory and Speke Road has been demolished.

== Architecture ==
The factory was designed by Mewès and Davis in conjunction with the structural engineer Sven Bylander. The factory range was constructed of reinforced flat-slab concrete; it was the first building in the United Kingdom to use this technique. (Note: The technique uses beamless floor slabs, and was an important step in the development of the use of reinforced concrete constructional systems in the 20th century.) The service wing is in brick. The former factory wing is in two storeys, it has a front of thirty-five bays, and is three bays deep. It is constructed as a concrete frame on a brick plinth, the frame being filled with glass. The columns are decorated with Lancashire roses, and between the storeys is a band of coloured tiles. On the roof is a cylindrical water tower with a pointed top. On the rear of the range are six silver-coloured corrugated cylindrical service pods with slot windows. The former service range extends for sixteen bays and is three bays deep, with an extension of thirteen bays, one bay deep. Inside the former factory are two arcades of circular columns with mushroom-shaped heads and square-shaped bearing pads. There are concrete staircases in the middle of the building and at the ends.

== Appraisal ==
The former factory was designated as a Grade II listed historic building on 17 February 1998. Grade II is the lowest of the three grades of listing, and includes buildings that "are nationally important and of special interest".

== See also ==
- Grade II listed buildings in Liverpool-L19

== Notes and references ==
Notes

Citations
