= Ernesto Perez-Carrillo =

Ernesto Perez-Carrillo Jr.
- Perez-Carrillo in Miami in 2009
- Born: November 1951 (age 74); Pinar Del Rio, Cuba
- Occupation: Cigar manufacturer
- Known for: Prior co-owner of La Gloria Cubana and co-founder of EPC Cigar Co. LLC
- Website: www.carrillocigars.com

Ernesto Perez-Carrillo Jr. (born 1952), is a Cuban American cigar maker who resides in Coral Gables, Florida, and the Dominican Republic.

== Career ==
Perez-Carrillo, is behind the cigar brand La Gloria Cubana. As a young adult, Perez-Carrillo's passion was for jazz. He worked to become a jazz drummer and, at the age of 25, moved to New York City to pursue a career as a musician. After exhausting his efforts to catch on with Stan Getz and his band, he returned to Miami, and began to work on cigars. He took over El Credito, his father's cigar company, and set out to create a better cigar.

The La Gloria Cubana was popular in the cigar craze of the early 1990s and, in 1999, Swedish Match purchased El Credito from the Perez-Carrillo family. After working for Swedish Match/General Cigar until March 2009, Perez-Carrillo's children proposed for him to craft a new cigar. With the start of E.P. Carrillo, Perez-Carrillo worked with his daughter, Lissette and son, Ernesto III.

The company's factory, La Tabacalera Alianza, is in the Dominican Republic. In 2014 Perez-Carrillo made the La Historia EIII, the No. 2 Cigar of the Year according to Cigar Aficionado magazine. Then in 2018 the Carrillo cigar, Encore Majestic received the highest honor as No. 1 Cigar of the Year from Cigar Aficionado. In 2020 Perez-Carrillo won the No. 1 Cigar of the year from Cigar Aficionado, with the Pledge Cigar.

== Marriage and children ==
Perez-Carrillo learned the trade from his father. He has two children. Prior to joining EPC Cigar Co., his son Ernesto Perez-Carrillo III worked for Kohlberg Kravis Roberts and McKinsey & Company in New York City. His daughter Lissette McPhillips Perez-Carrillo worked for Paul, Weiss, Rifkind, Wharton & Garrison LLP.
