= Dick Smith Foods =

Australian food brand

Dick Smith Foods was a food brand created by Australian entrepreneur Dick Smith to provide Australian owned and produced alternatives to products from foreign-owned food companies. Generally, the brand focused on producing local alternatives to products with large market shares like Kraft peanut butter and Vegemite. However, Dick Smith Foods did not manufacture its own food products; instead, it sourced products from other Australian-owned companies, which licensed the Dick Smith Foods brand label. Dick Smith Foods also donated a portion of its profits to charitable causes.

On 26 July 2018, Dick Smith announced that the business would close in 2019, blaming competition from German supermarket Aldi.

== History ==
Dick Smith Foods was formed in 1999 largely in response to the high market share of international companies such as Kraft, and the increasingly frequent take-over of previously Australian-owned companies including Arnott's and Pauls. In particular, Smith was concerned that many companies which were no longer Australian owned still marketed their products as "Australian": the iconic Australian breakfast spread Vegemite, for example, was owned at the time by Kraft Foods.

In 2004, Smith announced his intention to make Dick Smith Foods a commercial operation, and to list it on the stock market by 2009. In the same year, Smith offered to purchase Vegemite from Kraft, but was unsuccessful (it was ultimately later acquired by Australian company Bega Cheese in 2017). In 2006, the Herald Sun newspaper reported that Dick Smith Foods turnover had halved, due in part to the difficulty of finding local suppliers for their products.

In 2011, Smith announced that he would be taking control of the management of the company again, after turnover dropped from $80 million to $8 million over the previous five years. He implemented a vision for the return to Australian-owned, Australian-grown produce where all the profits stay in Australia, instead of heading offshore as they do with the majority of foreign-owned food suppliers. The company had previously been managed, and some of its products produced under licence, by the Sanitarium Health and Wellbeing Company, which paid Dick Smith Foods for the rights to the company's branding.

On 26 July 2018, Dick Smith announced that the business would close in 2019 in order to avoid bankruptcy. Smith blamed competition with German supermarket Aldi's products for the demise of the brand.

== Products ==
The company produced a number of products covering various categories, sometimes with names parodying existing products. Some of these include:

- Ozesauce tomato sauce
- Yeast spreads under the names Dickiemite and Ozemite
- Ozehoney
- Ozenuts peanut butter
- Tim Tam-inspired chocolate biscuits under the Temptin' and TT names
- Dicks True Blue chest rub and throat lozenges

=== Dickheads ===

Dickheads were Dick Smith Foods' brand of matches (1999–2002). The name is a parody of the Redheads brand of matches, replacing "Red" with Dick Smith's first name. The matchboxes were originally printed and made in North Richmond, New South Wales, Australia by Hanna Match, from local and imported materials. The brand's graphic designer was Craig Gregory. Later, they were distributed by Steric Trading Pty Ltd in Villawood NSW. Although the matchsticks and matchheads were made overseas, local packaging allowed the product to be labelled "Australian made". They were first sold in boxes of 25, "DICKHEADS 25", then 22 "DICKHEADS 22", then finally 20 "DICKHEADS 20".

The back of the box reads:

We would have to be complete dickheads to let most of our famous Australian brands be taken over by foreign companies. Brands such as Vegemite, Aeroplane Jelly, Arnott's, Speedo and Redhead Matches are in overseas hands. This means the profit and wealth created goes overseas and robs our children and grandchildren of a future. A protest from Dick Smith Foods. As Australian as you can get.

== Legal issues ==
Dick Smith Foods ran into legal difficulties in 2003, when Arnott's Biscuits took the company to court. The issue was a trademark dispute over Dick Smith Foods' "Temptin'" brand of chocolate biscuits, which Arnott's alleged had diluted their trademark for their similar Tim Tam biscuits, in similarly designed packaging. The case was settled out of court with an agreement to modify package font, and Smith responded by casting Greg Arnott, a member of the Arnott family, in a commercial for the biscuits.
