= La Gloria Cubana (cigar) =

Cuban and Dominican cigar brands

La Gloria Cubana is the name of two premium cigar brands, one produced on the island of Cuba for Habanos SA, the Cuban state-owned tobacco company, and the other produced in the Dominican Republic by El Credito Cigar Company for General Cigar Company, now a subsidiary of Swedish Match. La Gloria Cubana was sold to General Cigar Company by Ernesto Perez-Carrillo in 1999 for an undisclosed sales price.

== History ==
The La Gloria Cubana brand was created in 1885 by the Sociedad Cabañas y Castro, then bought twenty years later in 1905 by José F. Rocha, who manufactured the brand from his factory at 364 Miguel Street in Havana. After Rocha died in 1954, the Cifuentes family bought both La Gloria Cubana and Bolivar from Rocha's former company. Production was moved to the Partagás Factory, where it's still produced today, and became very popular as an export brand.

After the Revolution, the brand and factory were seized and stolen by the new Castro regime and new communist government. They stopped production of La Gloria Cubana for several years, until around 1965 when the brand was apparently resurrected at the old Partagás Factory. It is produced in smaller quantities than other brands and maintains its popularity with connoisseurs, the Médaille d'Or No. 2 is a particularly prized vitola.

La Gloria Cubana also produces two machine-made cigarillos: the Mini and the Purito.

=== Vitolas in the La Gloria Cubana Line ===
The following list of vitolas de salida (commercial vitolas) within the La Gloria Cubana marque lists their size and ring gauge in Imperial (and Metric), their vitolas de galera (factory vitolas), and their common name in American cigar slang.

Hand-Made Vitolas

- Médaille d'Or No. 1 - 7 1/4" × 36 (184 × 14.29 mm), Delicado Extra, a long panetela
- Médaille d'Or No. 2 - 6 3/4" × 43 (171 × 17.07 mm), Dalia, a lonsdale
- Médaille d'Or No. 3 - 6 7/8" × 28 (175 × 11.11 mm), Panetela Larga, a slim panetela
- Médaille d'Or No. 4 - 6" × 32 (152 × 12.70 mm), Palmita, a slim panetela
- Taíno - 7" × 47 (178 × 18.65 mm), Julieta No. 2, a churchill

Edición Regional Releases

- Marshall (Adriatic 2008) - 4 7/8" × 50 (124 × 19.84 mm) Robusto, a robusto
- Glorioso (United Kingdom 2008) - 6 1/8" × 50 (156 × 19.84 mm) Doble, a robusto extra
- Deliciosos (Cuba 2009) - 5.0" × 48 (127 × 48 mm) Hermosos No. 4, a Corona Extra(commonly assumed to be a robusto)
- Triunfos (Switzerland 2010) - 6.3" × 50 (160 × 50 mm) Magnum 50, Double Robusto
- Belux No.1(Belux(Belgium and Luxembourg) 2011) - 5.5" × 52 (140 × 52 mm) Genios, Robusto Extra

LCDH Exclusives

- Inmensos (2010) - 6.5" × 54 (164 × 54 mm) Sublimes, Double Robusto

== See also ==
- Cigar brands
