= New Islington =

Coordinates: 53.4823°N 2.2233°W

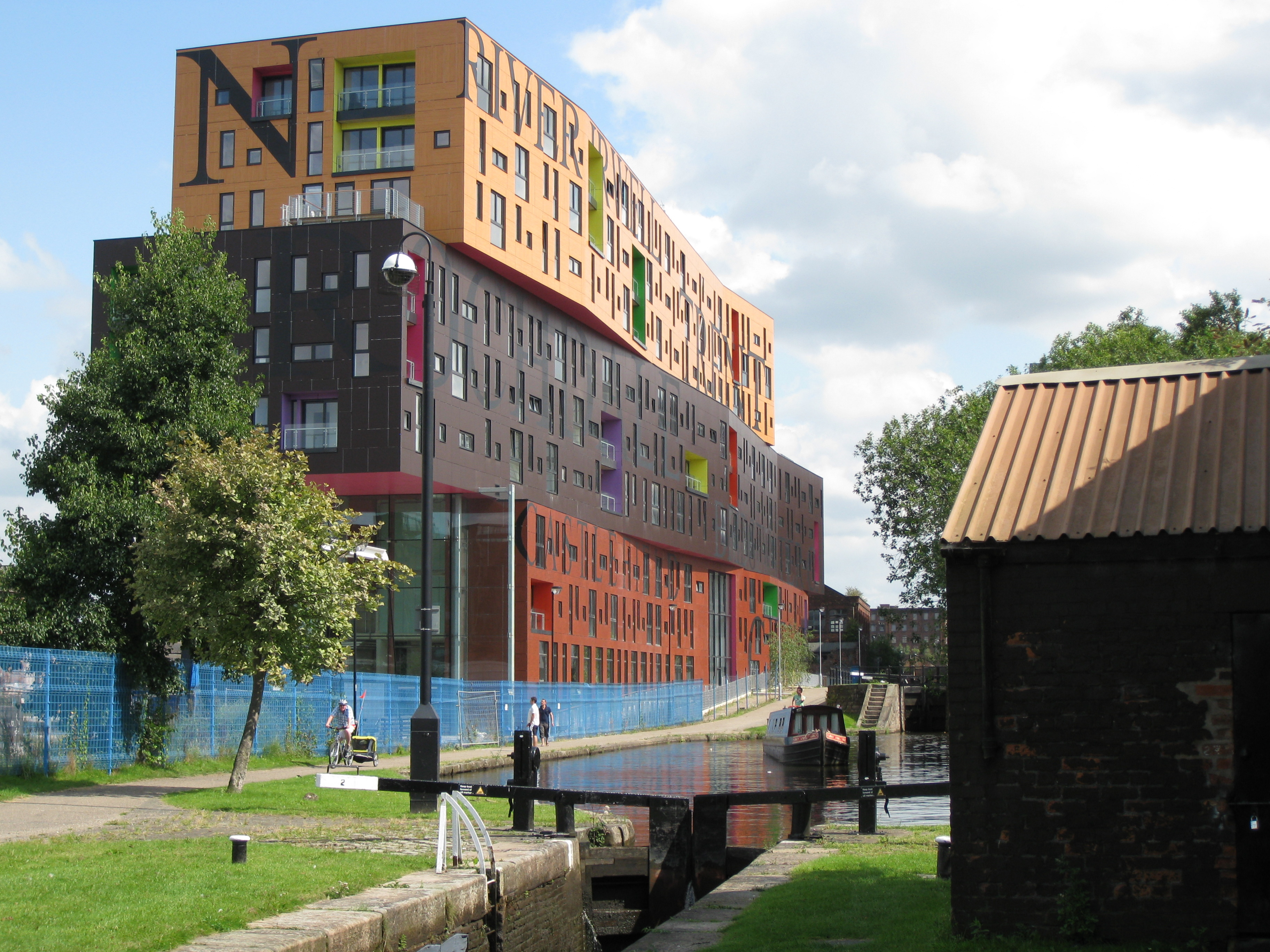
- Will Alsop's Chips development, New Islington, and lock 2 on the Ashton Canal.

- Location within Greater Manchester
- Metropolitan borough: Manchester
- Metropolitan county: Greater Manchester
- Region: North West
- Country: England
- Sovereign state: United Kingdom
- Post town: MANCHESTER
- Postcode district: M4
- Dialling code: 0161
- Police: Greater Manchester
- Fire: Greater Manchester
- Ambulance: North West
- UK Parliament: Manchester Central

New Islington is an inner city area of Manchester, in North West England. Historically in Lancashire and part of Ancoats, it has taken a separate identity to reflect its changed status as a regeneration area.

== History ==
The name "New Islington" is recorded at least as early as 1817 and appeared on the 1840 Ordnance Survey map. There is also a street bearing the name. The name was still current in the 1960s and 70s, there being at the time, a New Islington swimming baths, New Islington Primitive Methodist church, and New Islington Conservative club. However, the name for the area fell out of usage. From its attempted regeneration in the 1970s to its current redevelopment it was known as the Cardroom Estate. By the turn of the millennium, the Cardroom Estate had a reputation as being "a crime-ridden place stuck between the Rochdale and Ashton canals". It was one of several millennium village projects around seeking to regenerate inner-city areas. The name New Islington was also the local residents' choice of name for the area when the prospect of regeneration was raised.

New Islington is one of the seven Millennium Communities Programme areas. Funding for the area was secured in 2002 and property developers Urban Splash have been at the forefront of developments including the Chips building.

In 2007, coinciding with the regeneration of the area, the Ancoats Primary Care Centre was opened on Old Mill Street.

The New Islington Medical Practice operates in the centre. The Grade II listed Ancoats Dispensary is also situated on Old Mill Street. The building became the centre of a dispute between re-developers Urban Splash, who wanted to demolish it, and campaigners fighting to save it. The Dispensary was spared demolition in 2013.

In July 2014, the Ancoats Dispensary Trust, which intend to redevelop the building, received a £770,000 grant from the Heritage Lottery Fund to help stabilise and repair the building.. By October 2018 works on the site had stalled, but during 2023-23 the Dispensary was finally redeveloped into residential apartments. This retained the facade of the historic Grade II listed building whilst ensuring it has a use for the 21st century

== Governance ==
New Islington falls within the city and borough of Manchester, itself in the metropolitan county of Greater Manchester. New Islington falls within the Ancoats and Beswick electoral ward. The ward has three councillors which represent their area on Manchester City Council.

The New Islington area is represented by the Manchester Central parliamentary constituency. The current MP is Lucy Powell (Labour Co-operative) who represents the constituency within the House of Commons. Powell was elected following a by-election in 2012.

== Transport ==
New Islington is bounded by Great Ancoats Street to the west, the Rochdale Canal to the north-west, New Union Street and New Islington to the north-east, Weybridge Road on the east and Pollard Street to the south. The area is served by New Islington tram stop on the Metrolink's East Manchester Line. The stop, adjacent to Pollard Street, opened in February 2013. In December 2013 the Transport for Greater Manchester Committee announced after their annual fares review that the station would now fall in the City Zone category.

== Education ==
The Co-op Academy New Islington primary school is located on Hugh Oldham Way, New Islington Marina and is bordered by the Rochdale Canal. The school is operated by Manchester Grammar School and supported by Manchester City Council.

== Image gallery ==
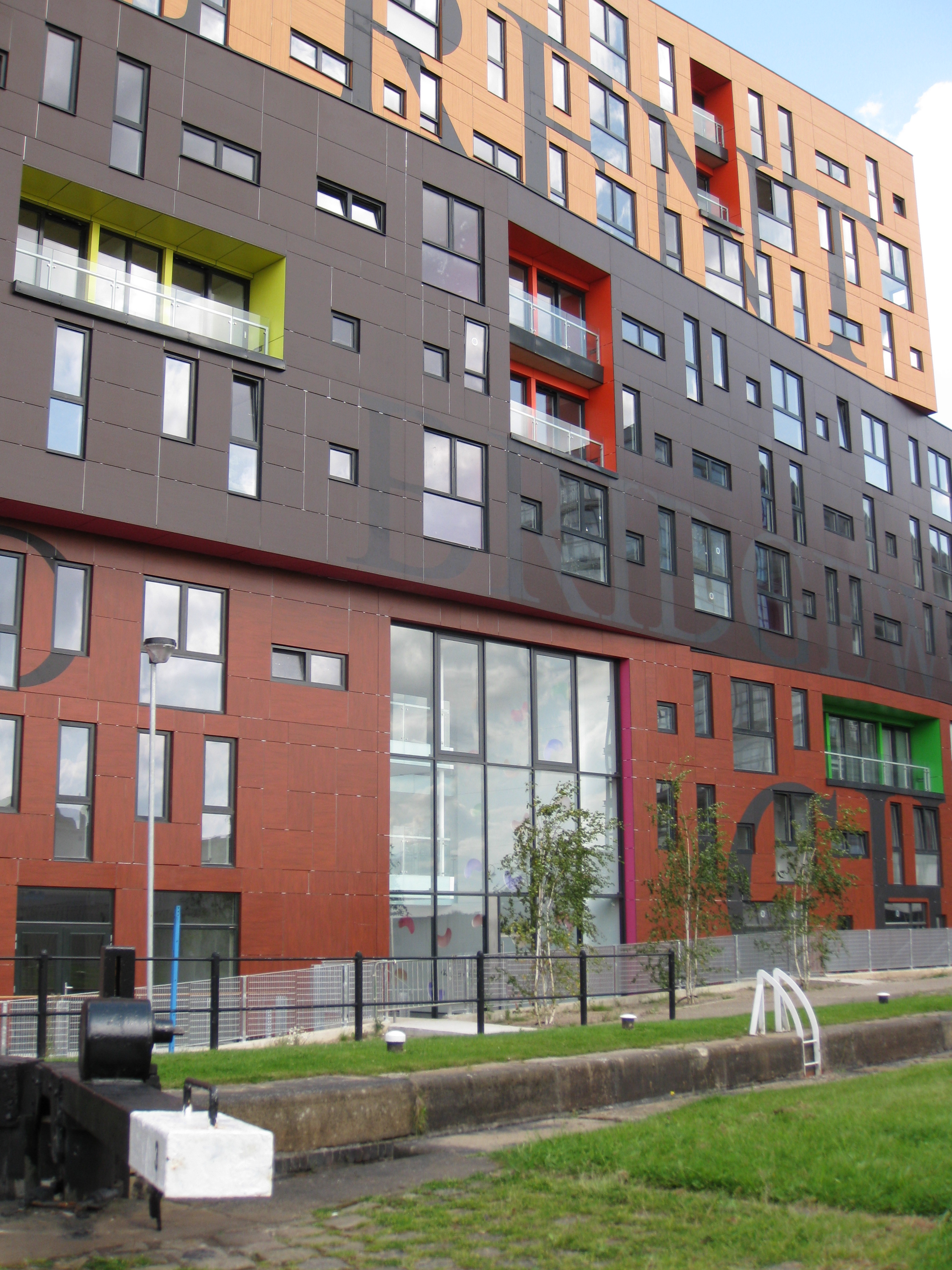
Chips (2009)

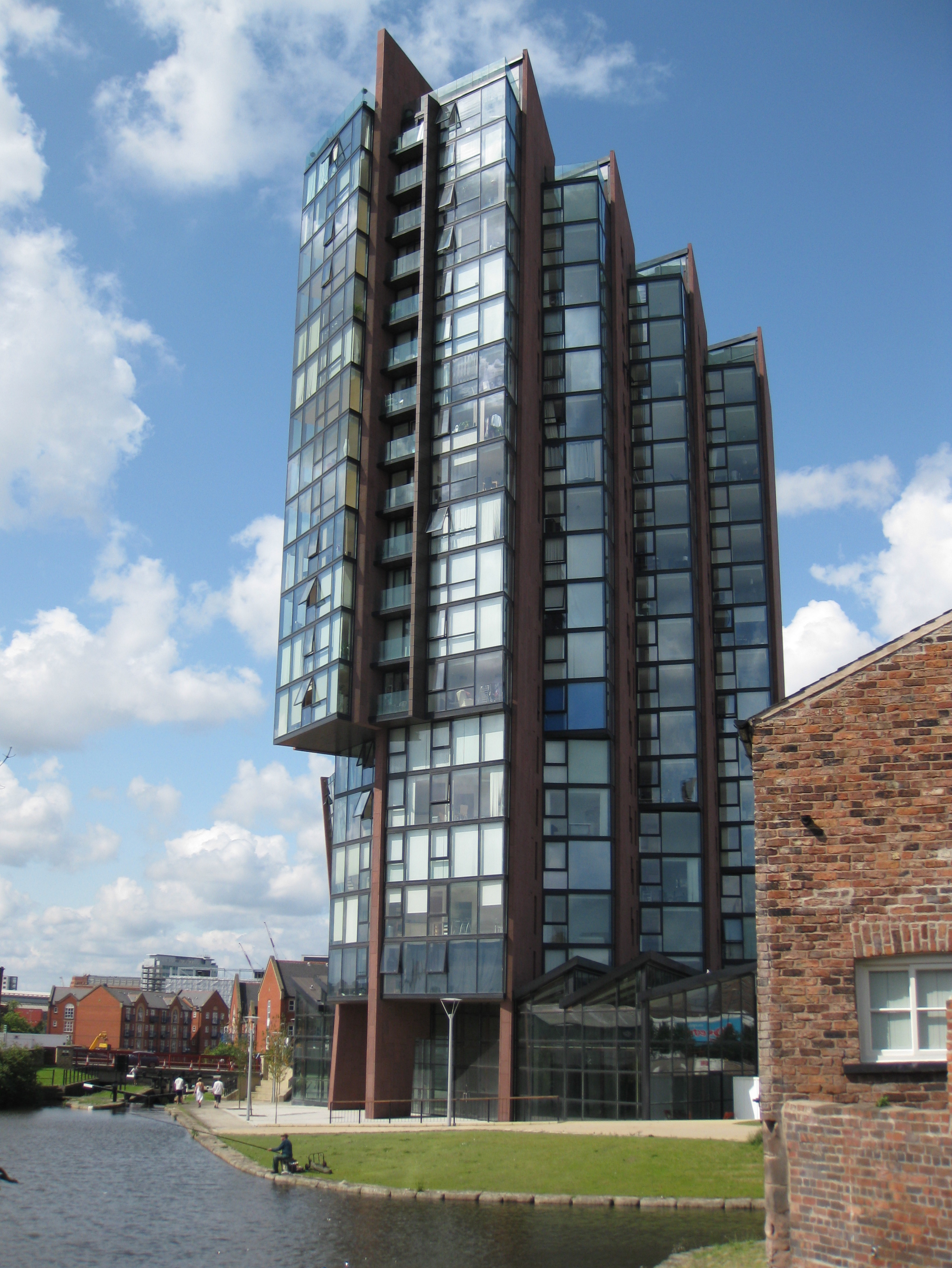
Islington Wharf Phase 1 (2010)

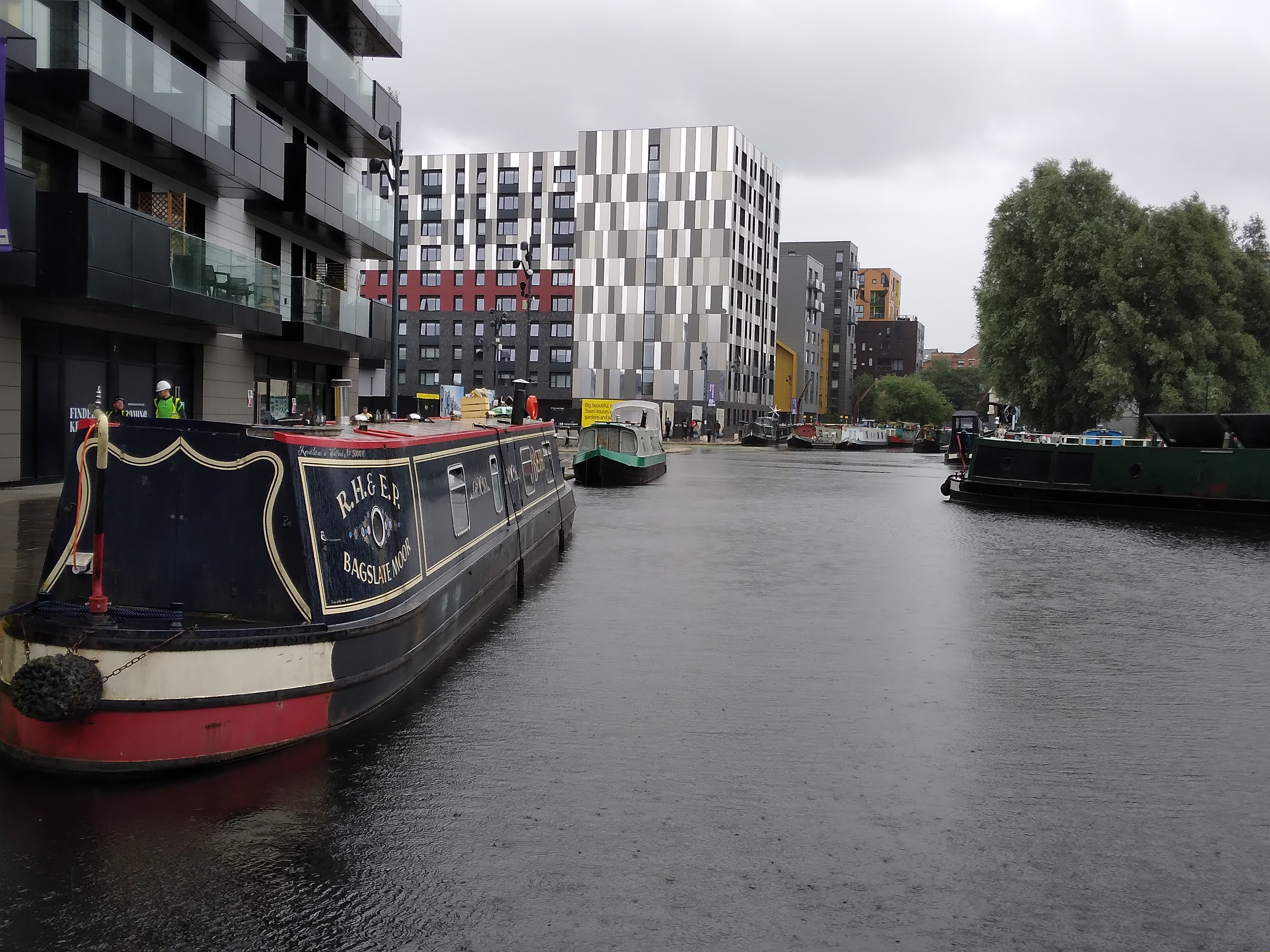
Modern developments overlooking the New Islington canal branch, 2023

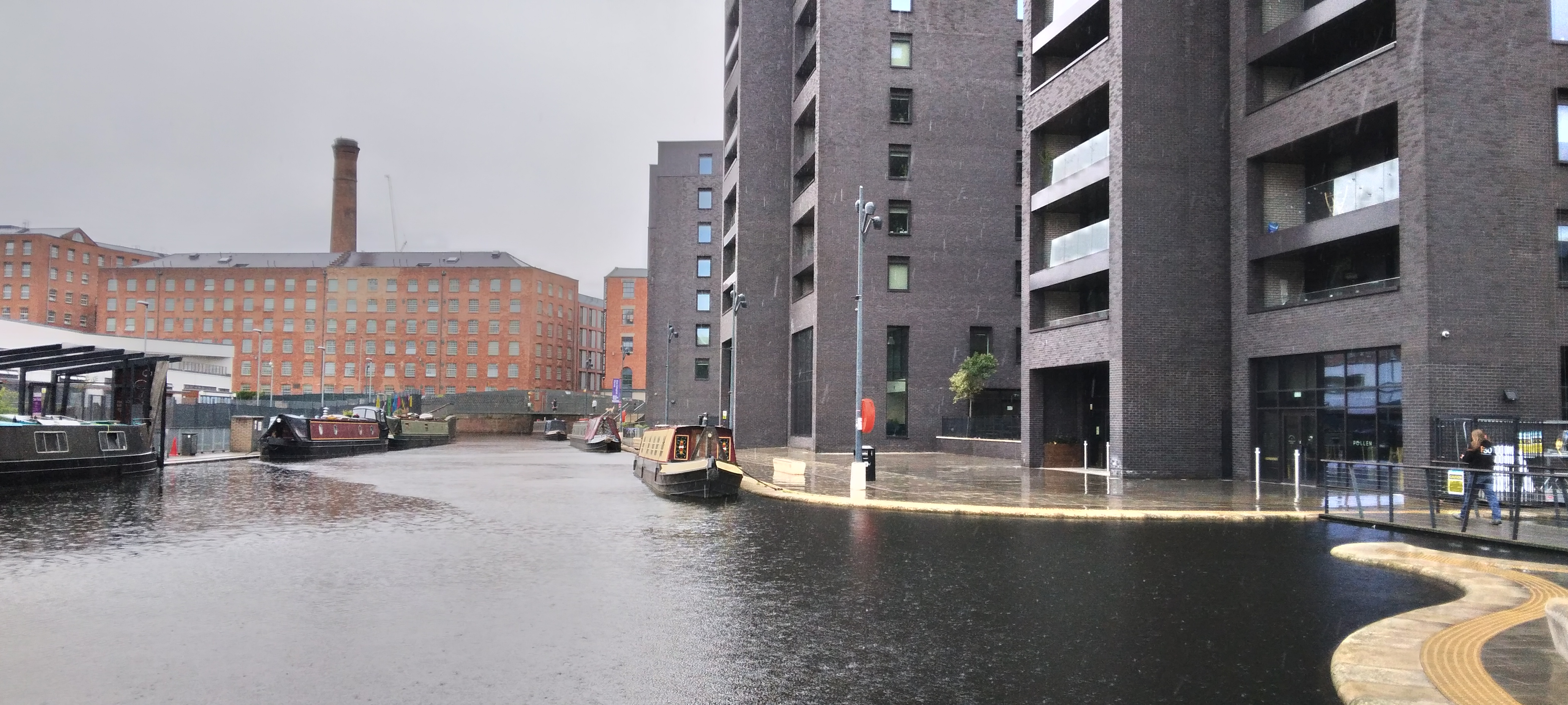
Old Mill (left), and Cotton Field Wharf (right)

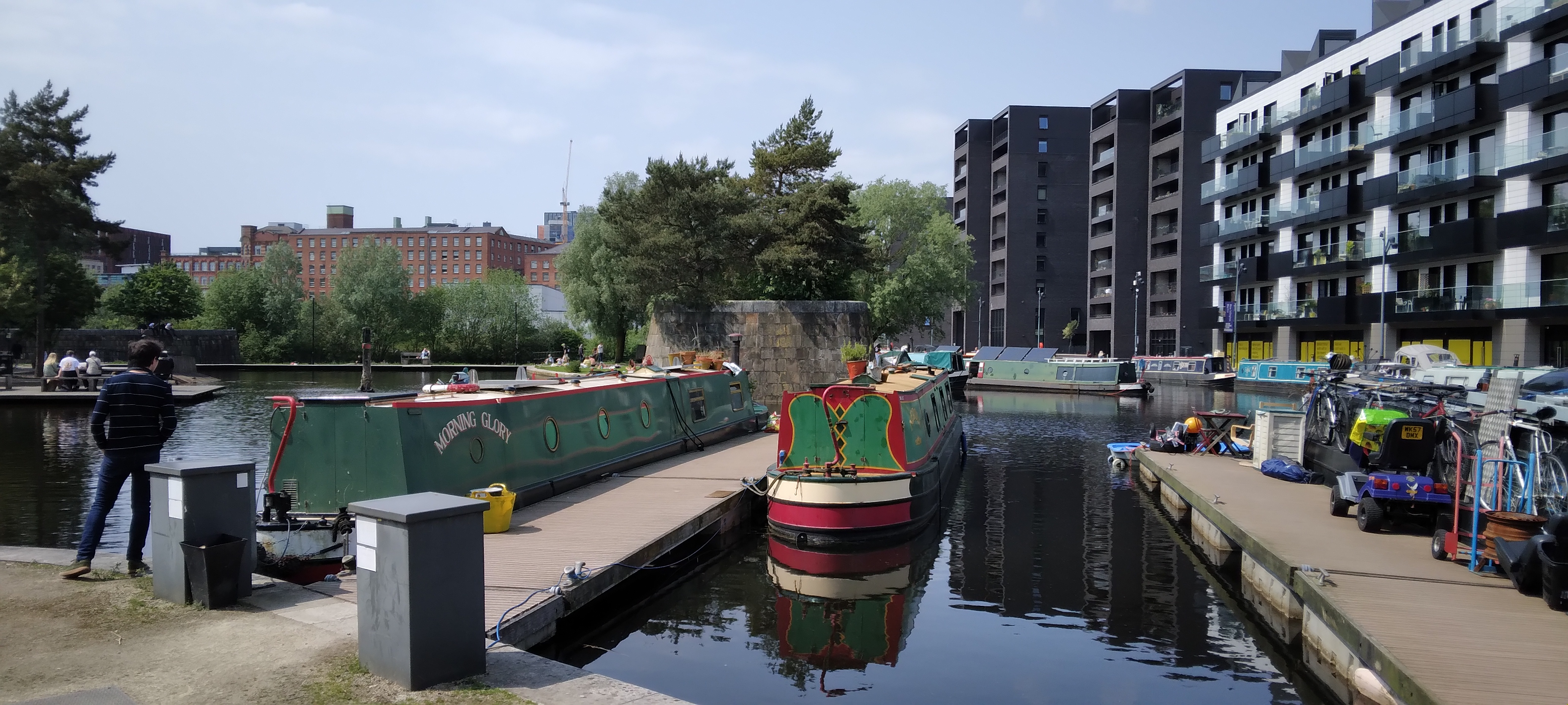
New Islington marina in May
