= Redheads (matches) =

Australian brand of matches

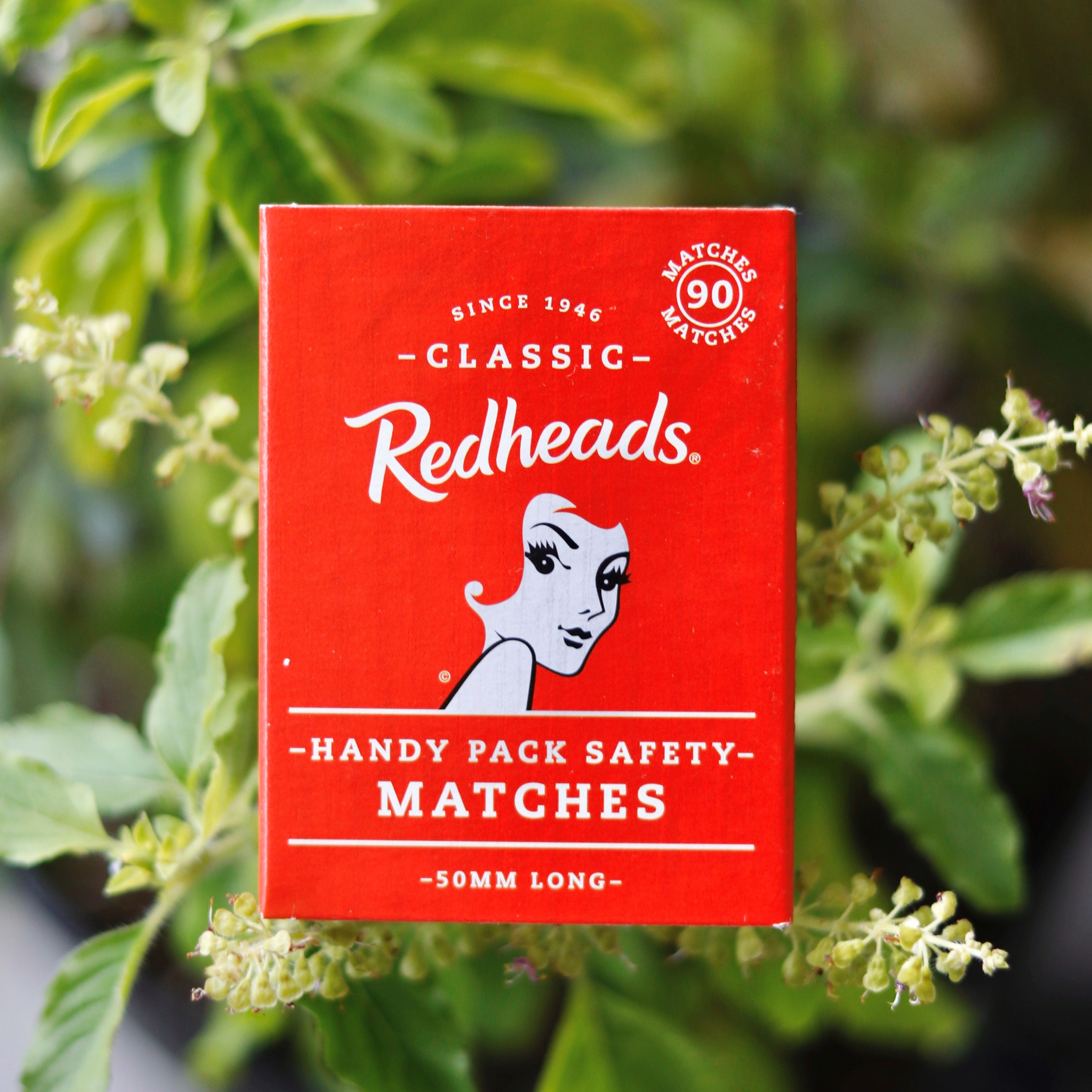
Redhead Matchbox

Redheads is an Australian brand of matches, originally manufactured by Bryant and May in Richmond, Victoria, but now manufactured in Sweden by Swedish Match. It is Australia's top-selling match brand.

Matches were first produced in Australia in 1909. Initially they were made of white phosphorus.

In 1946 Bryant & May began making safety matches in Australia, using red phosphorus as the striking surface. The Redhead name refers to the red striking-heads of the matches, which were first sold in Australia in 1947.

The logo on the matchbox depicts the head and right shoulder of a redheaded woman, and has had four major updates since its introduction, with a number of special issues also produced.

== See also ==
- Bryant and May Factory, Melbourne
- Dickheads (brand)
