= Tom Bloxham (property developer) =

British businessman

Tom Bloxham CBE

Chancellor of the University of Manchester
- In office 1 August 2008 – 1 August 2015
- Preceded by: Anna Ford and Terry Leahy
- Succeeded by: Lemn Sissay

Personal details
- Born: Thomas Paul Richard Bloxham; 20 December 1963 (age 62) Fleet, Lincolnshire, England
- Education: Victoria University of Manchester
- Profession: Chairman and Co-Founder, Urban Splash
- Salary: £150,000 plus dividends.

Thomas Paul Richard Bloxham CBE (born 20 December 1963) is a British property developer, founder of award winning urban renewal property development company Urban Splash and the modern housebuilder House by Urban Splash - companies which have won 450 awards to date for architecture, design and business success.

In 1999 Bloxham was appointed a Member of the Order of the British Empire (MBE) in the 1999 Birthday Honours for Services to Architecture and Urban Regeneration, and a Commander of the Order of the British Empire (CBE) for services to culture in the 2025 Birthday Honours. The CBE was recognition of his role as Chair of Manchester International and Factory International.

== Background ==
Bloxham was born in Hampshire and went to Tiffin School leaving in 1983 to go to Manchester to study Politics & Modern History at the Victoria University of Manchester where he received a 2:2 degree. Before university he sold fire extinguishers to businesses and he increased sales by setting his briefcase on fire and then extinguishing it. At University he started a poster business selling posters at student unions across the north of England. After university he opened a music and film poster shop in Afflecks Palace.

== Urban Splash ==
Bloxham began subletting portions of his unit at Afflecks Palace and this began his career in property. Bloxham co-founded Urban Splash with architect Jonathan Falkingham and initially converted redundant properties, mainly formerly industrial buildings, in north west England into city centre residential loft apartments.

Headquartered in Castlefield, Manchester, with regional bases in Liverpool, Leeds, Bristol, Sheffield, Cambridgeshire and Plymouth, the company has created more than 6,000 new homes and jobs and over two million sq ft of commercial space. The company has won over 490 awards for architecture and regeneration, including 46 RIBA awards. In 2024 the Urban Splash Park Hill building in Sheffield was nominated for the RIBA Stirling Prize; it was the second time the building had made the Stirling Prize list having been shortlisted in 2013.

He is an Honorary Fellow of the Royal Institute of British Architects (RIBA) and in 1999, he was given an MBE.

In September 2012 the company reported pre-tax losses of £9.3 million and debts of £234.4 million for the previous year.

In the aftermath of the 2017 Grenfell Tower fire a number of Urban Splash developments were found to have been constructed using flammable cladding and to not comply with the required Building regulations in the United Kingdom.

== Pro Bono Appointments ==
Bloxham was elected Chancellor of The University of Manchester in June 2008 to take office from 1 August 2008 for a period of seven years. Bloxham was installed as Chancellor at a ceremony at the University's Whitworth Hall on 3 December 2008. At the same ceremony Sir Bernard Lovell, Sir Tim Berners-Lee, Edward Gregson and Eddie Davies received honorary degrees.

He completed his term of office on 1 August 2015 and was succeeded by the poet and broadcaster Lemn Sissay.

Tom has also held other pro bono positions including a Trustee of the Big Issue North, a Founding Chair of the Ancoats Urban Village Trust, a Founding Chair Centre for Cities Think Tank (2007 – 2010) and Chair Arts Council (NW) (1999 – 2008).

He was a Trustee of the Tate from 2009 to 2017, a Founding Trustee of the MUFC Foundation (2007 – present), a Founding Trustee of the Bloxham Charitable Trust (2001 – present) and Founding Trustee of the Urban Splash Charitable Trust (2008 – present).

== Other Achievements ==
Bloxham was Founding Chair of the Manchester International Festival which was established in 2004.

In 2019 he was named North West Insider Property Personality of the Year and was named in the 2016 City AM Entrepreneur list. He has won awards including The College of Estate Management Property Award (2008) and The Royal Society of Arts RSA Bicentenary Medal.

Bloxham has received an Honorary Fellowship, Cumbria University, an Honorary Doctorate of Business, University of Plymouth, an Honorary Doctorate, University of Manchester, an Honorary Degree of Doctor of Design, University of West England, an Honorary Doctorate of Design, Oxford Brookes University, and an Honorary Fellowship, Liverpool John Moores University.

In 2022, The Manchester School of Architecture announced Bloxham as visiting professor of Urban Regeneration.
