= Jonathan Falkingham =

British architect and property developer

Jonathan Mark Falkingham MBE
- Born: Bradford, Yorkshire
- Education: Liverpool University
- Occupation: Architect
- Practice: Urban Splash

Jonathan Mark Falkingham MBE (born c. 1962, Bradford, Yorkshire, England) is a British architect and property developer, co-founder of urban renewal property development company Urban Splash.

== Background ==
Jonathan Falkingham was born in Bradford, Yorkshire. He studied architecture at Liverpool University graduating in 1988.

Falkingham's wife Nicole, who he started dating in 2003, was found dead from hypothermia in January 2013 after a night out with friends.

== Career ==
Falkingham founded the design company Shed in 1991, which merged with King McAllister to become shedkm.

In 1993 Falkingham co-founded the property development company Urban Splash, of which he is the chief executive. The company specialises in converting redundant industrial buildings into city centre residential apartments. They have won over 100 awards for design, architecture and urban renewal.

Falkingham is a member the board of the Liverpool Architecture and Design Advisory Panel and a trustee of National Museums Liverpool.

== Awards and recognition ==
Falkingham's renovation of his own home, a 17th-century sandstone farmhouse in Allerton near Liverpool, won a Royal Institute of British Architects (RIBA) Excellence Award in 2005 and was shortlisted for the Manser Medal.

In the Queen's Birthday Honours 2013 Falkingham was appointed a Member of The Most Excellent Order of the British Empire (MBE) for services to architecture and regeneration.
