= Bryant & May =

British match manufacturers, 1843 to 1973

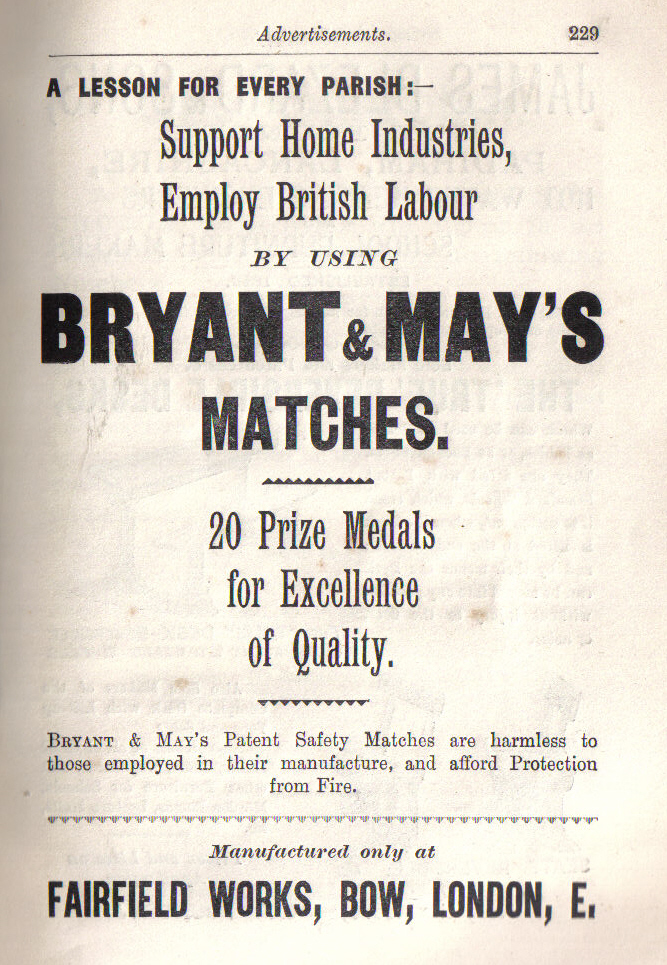
Advertisement from the Illustrated Guide to the Church Congress 1897

Bryant & May was a British match manufacturer, which today exists only as a brand name owned by Swedish Match. The company was formed in the mid-19th century as a dry goods trader, with its first match works, the Bryant & May Factory, located in Bow, London. It later opened other factories in the United Kingdom, Australia, and other parts of the world.

The firm was formed in 1843 by Quakers William Bryant and Francis May and survived as an independent concern for over seventy years before undergoing a series of mergers with other matchmakers and later consumer products companies.

Bryant & May was involved in three of the most divisive industrial episodes of the nineteenth century: the sweating of domestic out-workers, the wage "fines" that led to the London matchgirls strike of 1888 and the scandal of "phossy jaw".

Swedish Match owns the registered Bryant & May trade name, alongside those of many formerly independent companies once within the Bryant & May group.

== Formation ==
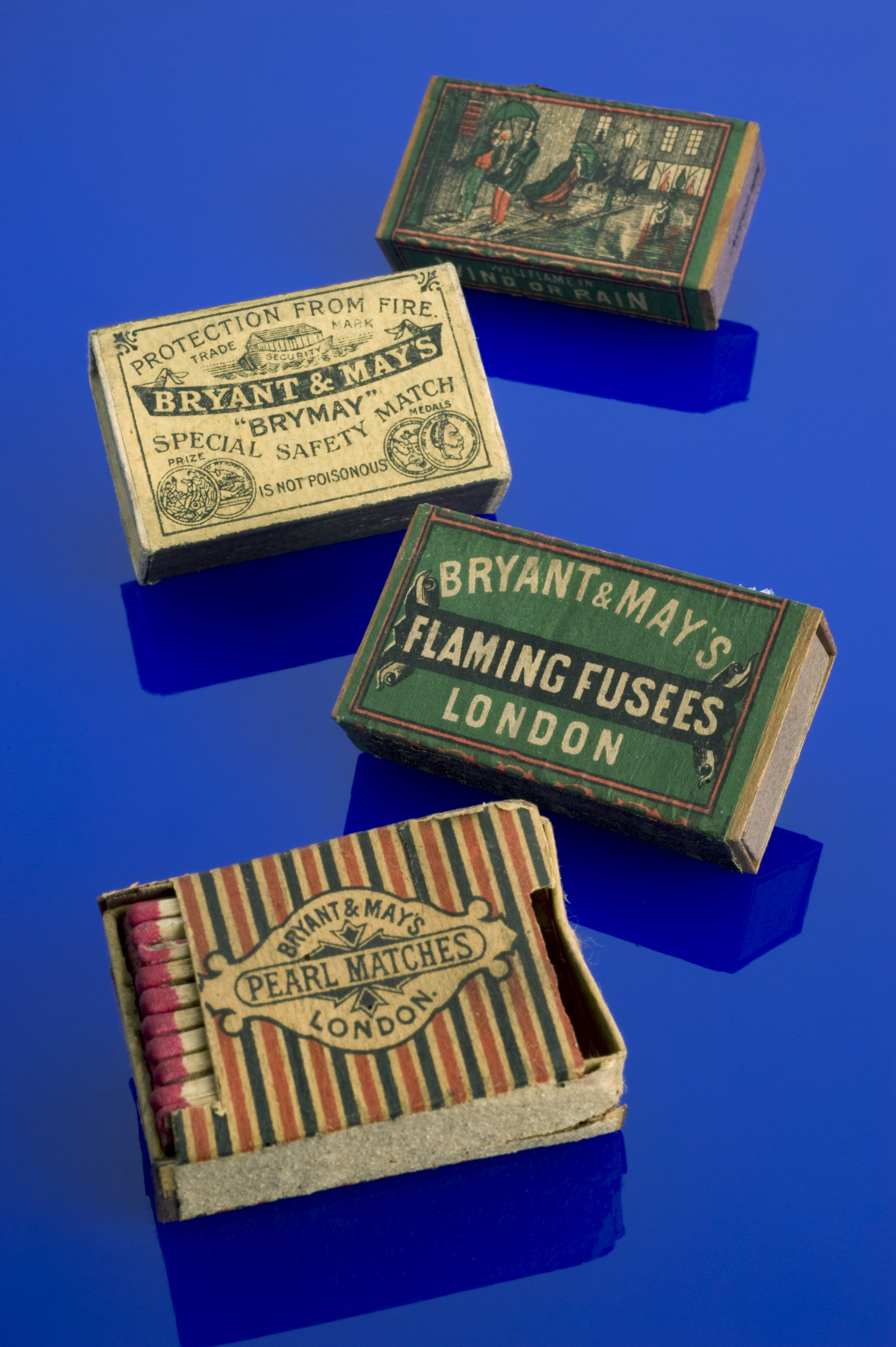
Bryant & May "Pearl" safety matches, 1890–1891

Bryant & May was formed in 1843 by Quakers William Bryant and Francis May to trade in general merchandise. In 1850 the company entered into a relationship with the Swedish match maker Johan Edvard Lundström in order to capture part of the market of the 250 million matches that were used in Britain each day. Its first order was for 10 or 15 cases of 720,000 matches (composed of 50 gross boxes of 100 matches each). The next order was for 50 cases; later orders were for 500. This partnership was successful, so the partners decided to merge the firm with a separate company owned by Bryant, Plymouth-based Bryant and James.

The company began production after purchasing the rights in Britain for £100. (Note: £100 in 1850 equates to approximately £11,639 in 2025 pounds, according to calculations based on the Consumer Price Index measure of inflation.) In line with their religious beliefs, Bryant and May decided to produce only safety matches, rather than lucifers. In 1850 the company sold 231,000 boxes; by 1855 this had risen to 10.8 million boxes and to 27.9 million boxes in 1860. Market preference in the UK was for the familiar lucifer match, and by 1880 Bryant & May were also producing them. The same year the company began exporting their goods; in 1884 they became a publicly-listed company. Dividends of 22.5 per cent in 1885 and 20 per cent in 1886 and 1887 were paid.

In 1861 Bryant relocated the business to a three-acre site, on Fairfield Road, Bow, east London. The building, an old candle factory, was demolished and a model factory was built in the mock-Venetian style popular at the time. The factory was heavily mechanised and included twenty-five steam engines to power the machinery. On nearby Bow Common, the company built a lumber mill to make splints from imported Canadian pine. Bryant & May were aware of "phossy jaw". If a worker complained of having toothache, they were told to have the teeth removed immediately or be sacked.

In the 1880s Bryant & May employed nearly 5,000 people, most of them female and Irish, or of Irish descent; by 1895 the figure was 2,000 people, of whom between 1,200 and 1,500 were women and girls. The workers were paid different rates for completing a ten-hour day, depending on the type of work undertaken. The frame-fillers were paid 1 shilling per 100 frames completed; the cutters received 2 3/4 d for three gross of boxes, and the packers got 1s 9d per 100 boxes wrapped up. Those under 14 years of-age received a weekly wage of about 4 s. Most workers were fortunate if they took the full amounts home, as a series of fines were levied by the foremen, with the money deducted directly from wages. The fines included 3 d for having an untidy workbench, talking or having dirty feet—many of the workers were bare-footed as shoes were too expensive; 5 d was deducted for being late; and a shilling for having a burnt match on the workbench. The women and girls involved in boxing up the matches had to pay the boys who brought them the frames from the drying ovens, and had to supply their own glue and brushes. One girl who dropped a tray of matches was fined 6 d.

The match boxes were made through domestic outwork under a sweating system, (Note: The Fifth Report from the Select Committee of the House of Lords on the Sweating System defined "sweating" as "the evils known by that name are ...: 1. A rate of wages inadequate to the necessities of the workers or disproportionate to the work done.; 2. Excessive hours of labour.; 3. The insanitary state of the houses in which the work is carried out.") which left workers uncovered by the Factory Acts. Such workers received 2 1/4 to 2 1/2 d per gross of boxes. The workers had to provide glue and string from their own funds.

In 1861, at the Fairfield Works, a dilapidated site that had once been used for the manufacture of candles, crinoline and rope, close to the River Lea in Bow, they began to manufacture their own safety matches and "other chemical lights". This site was gradually expanded as a model factory. The public were initially unwilling to buy the more expensive safety matches so they also made the more profitable traditional lucifer match.

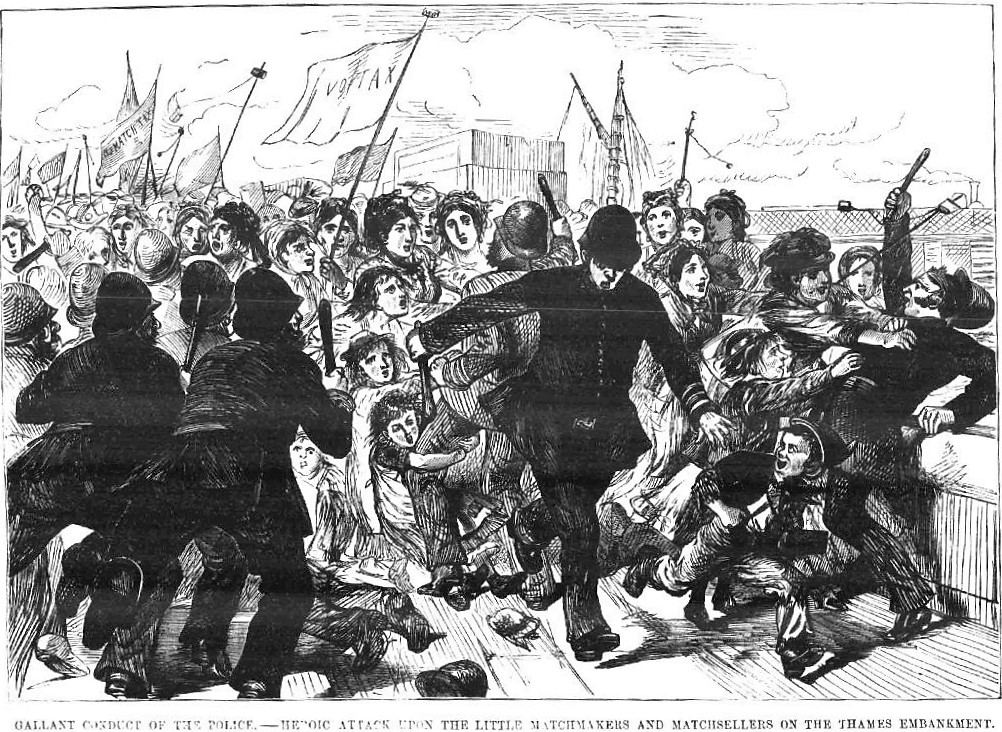
Cartoon from The Day's Doings, showing the police clashing with the match makers' march

In 1871 Robert Lowe, the Chancellor of the Exchequer, attempted to introduce a tax of 1/2 d per hundred matches. The Times, in a leader on the proposal, opined that the tax was "a singularly reactionary proposal" that would affect the poor more heavily. Match-making companies complained about the new levy and arranged a mass-meeting at Victoria Park, London on Sunday 23 April; 3,000 match workers attended, the majority of whom were from Bryant & May. It was resolved to march on the following day to the Houses of Parliament to present a petition. Several thousand match-makers set off from Bow Road in an orderly fashion.

The demonstration comprised mostly girls between the ages of thirteen and twenty, and were described in The Times as "beyond doubt of the working classes. They ... were accompanied by men and women of their own class, without any admixture of the usual agitators." The marchers were harassed along the way before their progress was blocked by police at Mile End Road. Much of the march progressed through the police line, but parts were split off and made their way via alternative routes to the Westminster, by which time the march numbered approximately 10,000. Clashes ensued, and The Times described that the police had "by their hard usage of the matchmakers and spectators, converted what was before not an ill-behaved gathering into a resisting, howling mob". The Manchester Guardian described that "policemen, strong in their sense of officialism, and bullying in their strength, approached the verge of brutality".

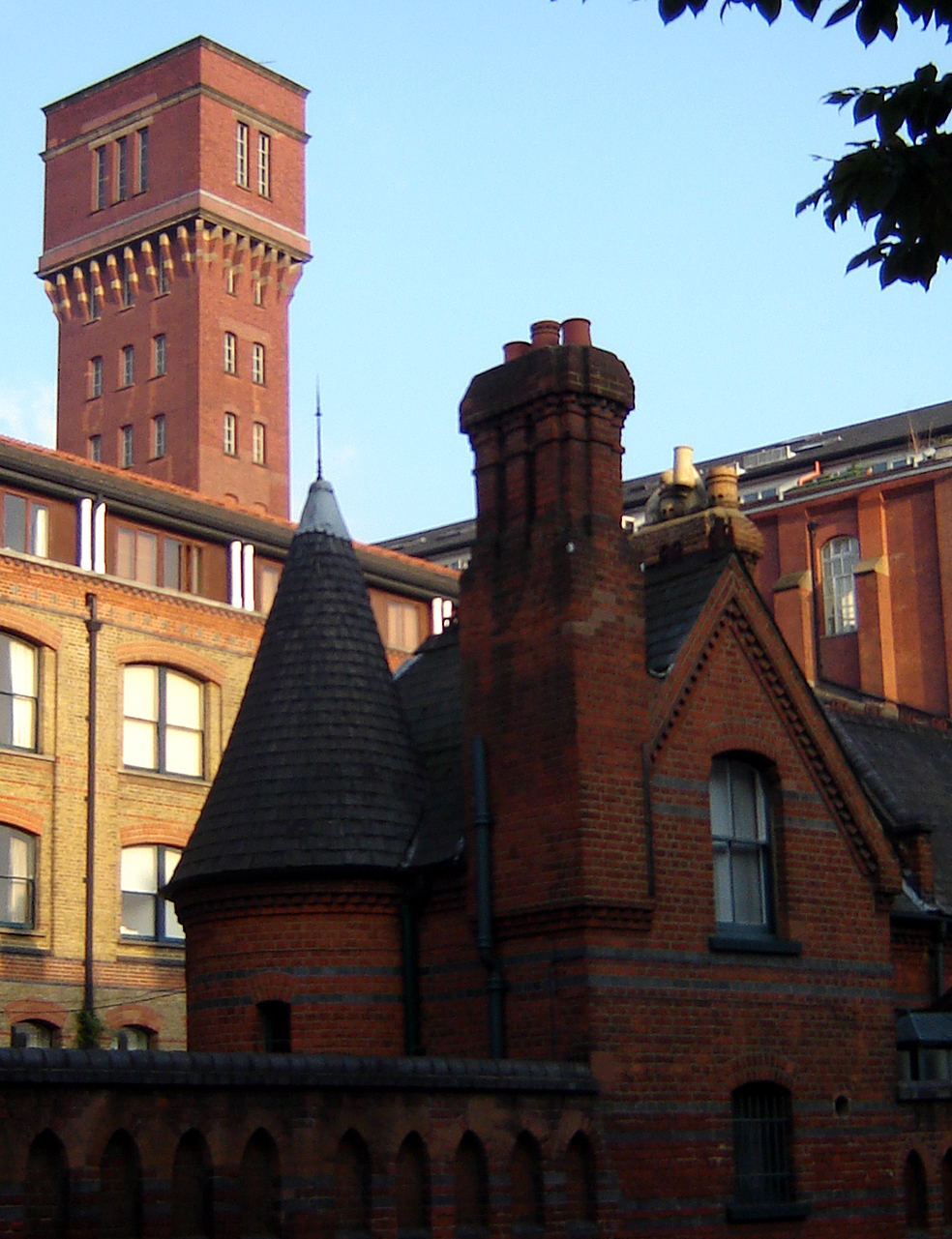
Bryant & May factory in Bow, which was rebuilt in 1910

On the same day as the meeting in Victoria Park, Queen Victoria wrote to the prime minister, William Gladstone, to protest about the tax:

it is difficult not to feel considerable doubt as to the wisdom of the proposed tax on matches ... [which] will be felt by all classes to whom matches have become a necessity of life. ... this tax which is intended should press on all equally will in fact only be severely felt by the poor which would be very wrong and most impolitic at the present moment.

The day following the march, Lowe announced in the House of Commons that the proposed tax was being withdrawn.

Bryant and May was involved in three of the most divisive industrial episodes of the nineteenth century, the sweating of domestic out-workers, the wage "fines" that led to the London matchgirls strike of 1888 and the scandal of "phossy jaw". The strike won important improvements in working conditions and pay for the mostly female workforce working with the dangerous white phosphorus.

The company rebuilt their Bow factory in 1909–1910, with many modern innovations including two tall towers housing water storage tanks for a sprinkler system. By 1911, it employed more than 2,000 female workers, the largest factory in London.

== Sale to, acquisition of, and mergers with other match makers ==
Bryant & May variously sold itself to, merged with, or took over rivals. These were:

Bell and Black

In 1885 – factories in Stratford, Manchester, York and Glasgow.

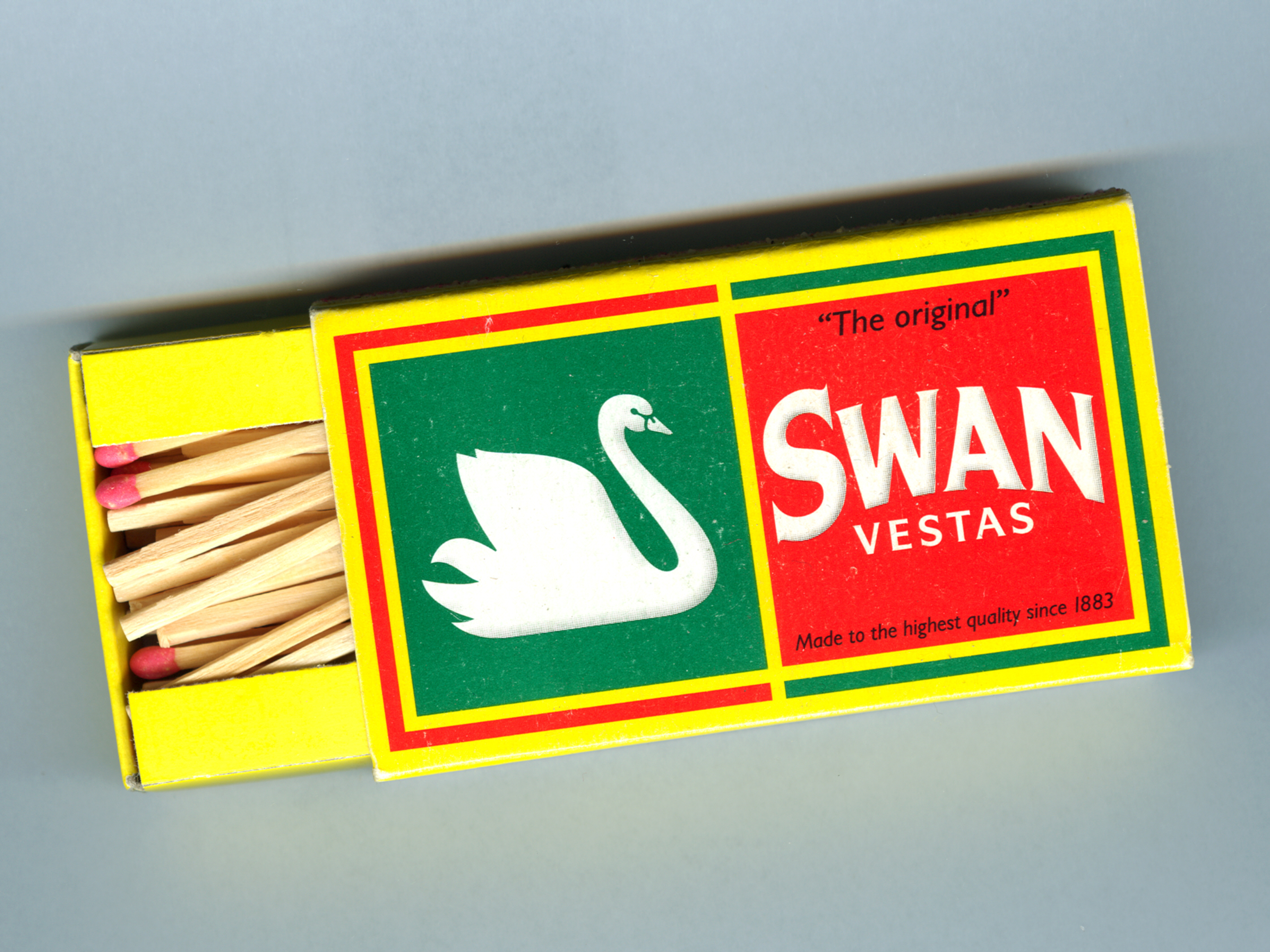
Swan Vesta matches, originally a brand of the Diamond Match Company

Diamond Match

In 1901 the American Diamond Match Company bought an existing match factory in the United Kingdom, at Litherland, near Liverpool, and installed a continuous match making machine that could produce 600,000 matches per hour. Its matches were sold under the Captain Webb, Puck and Swan Vesta brand names. Bryant & May could not compete, so in 1905 it sold a majority 54.5 per cent of its share capital to the (American) Diamond Match Company in return for the assets and goodwill of the British Diamond Match Company.

S. J. Moreland and Sons

In 1913 Bryant & May took over the Gloucester match maker S.J. Moreland and Sons, who made and sold matches under the trade name England's Glory.

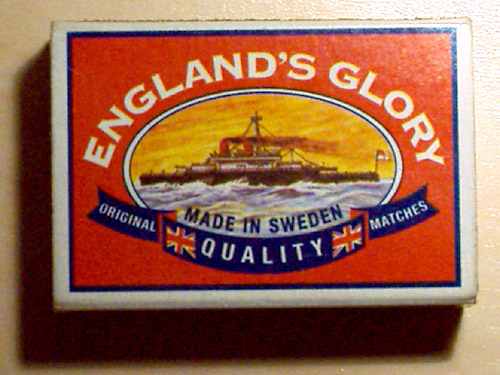
England's Glory brand matches

Swedish Match

In 1927 Bryant & May combined with J. John Masters & Co. Ltd (match importers and owners of the Abbey Match Works, Barking, Essex) and the Swedish Match company's interests in the British Empire (except for major plant in India and elsewhere in Asia) to become the British Match Corporation.

Albright and Wilson

In 1929, the British Match Corporation set up a jointly owned company with another Quaker company, The A & W Match Phosphorus Company. It took over that part of Albright and Wilson's Oldbury site which was manufacturing amorphous phosphorus and phosphorus sesquisulfide, as these two chemicals were used in safety matches and strike-anywhere matches, respectively.

Wilkinson Sword

In 1973 the British Match Corporation merged with Wilkinson Sword to form the new company Wilkinson Match.

Wilkinson Match's shares were acquired by US company Allegheny International from 1978 with Allegheny taking full ownership in 1980. In 1987 Allegheny filed for Chapter 11 bankruptcy and Swedish Match re-acquired the company. In 1990 Swedish Match sold the Wilkinson Sword business, retaining the match business.

== Closure ==
In 1971 the Northern Ireland factory, Maguire & Patterson, closed down following a terrorist attack. The original Bow match factory was closed in 1979, when it still employed 275 people; unlike some of the other match factories little recent investment had taken place. The Bow factory site consisted of a number of listed buildings, which have subsequently been converted into the Bow Quarter flats complex.

In the 1980s, factories in Gloucester and Glasgow closed, leaving Liverpool with the last Bryant & May match factory in the UK. It closed in December 1994, and was renovated into today's "The Matchworks" (a Grade II listed building) and the Matchbox.

The former Australian match factory, Bryant and May Factory, Melbourne, closed in the mid-1980s. This was converted into offices in 1989.

Some British match names continue to survive as brands of Swedish Match, but are made outside the UK. Some former shaving products survive, manufactured in Germany and sold under the trade name Wilkinson Sword in Europe, and the Schick name elsewhere.

== Products ==
=== Vitafruit ===
Vitafruit was a confectionery manufactured by the Bryant & May group in 1988. There were three varieties including tropical fruit flavour (Vitafruit), mint (Vitamint) and a throat soother (Vitasooth).

When Swedish Match acquired Bryant & May the confectionery arm of the business was sold and eventually the new owners stopped production of Vitafruit.

== Arms ==
Coat of arms of Bryant & May

Notes
Granted 4 January 1988
Crest
Upon a helm with a wreath Or and Gules upon water barry wavy Azure and Argent an ark Gules and rising behind the same a sun in splendour Gold.
Escutcheon
Gules semy of flames an Inescutcheon Or thereon four flames also Gules.
Supporters
On the dexter side a lion guardant Or incensed Proper and over the sinister shoulder a wreath of laver baldricwise also Proper and on the sinister side a swan its wings elevated and addorsed Proper the underside thereof semy of anchors Azure.
Compartment
A grassy mount with poplar stumps and saplings thereon all Proper.
Motto
Fiat Lux

== See also ==
- Bryant and May Factory, Bow
- Bryant and May Factory, Melbourne
- Mersey Match Factory
- Redheads (matches)

== Bibliography ==
=== Books ===
- Beaver, Patrick (1985). The Match Makers: The Story of Bryant & May. London: Henry Melland. ISBN 978-0-907929-11-6.
- Beer, Reg (1983). The Match Girls Strike, 1888. London: The Labour Museum. OCLC 16612310.
- Emsley, John (2000). The Shocking History of Phosphorus: A Biography of the Devil's Element. London: Macmillan. ISBN 978-0-333-76638-5.
- Raw, Louise (2011). Striking a Light: The Bryant and May Matchwomen and their Place in History. London: Continuum International. ISBN 978-1-4411-1426-6.

==== Official reports ====
- Fifth Report from the Select Committee of the House of Lords on the Sweating System (Report). London: Her Majesty's Stationery Office. 1890. OCLC 976630092.

=== News articles ===
- "The Government and the Matchmakers". The Times. 25 April 1871. p. 10.
- "Leader". The Times. 21 April 1871. p. 9.
- "The Matchmakers' Demonstration". The Guardian. 26 April 1871. p. 6. -->

=== Journals ===
- Satre, Lowell J. (September 1982). "After the Match Girls' Strike: Bryant and May in the 1890s". Victorian Studies. 6 (1): 7–31. JSTOR 3827491.

=== Internet and audio-visual media ===
- Arnold, A. J. (2004). "'Ex luce lucellum'? Innovation, class interests and economic returns in the nineteenth century match trade" (PDF). University of Exeter. ISSN 1473-2904.
- Clark, Gregory (2019). "The Annual RPI and Average Earnings for Britain, 1209 to Present (New Series)". MeasuringWorth.
