= Bow Quarter =

Building in Tower Hamlets, London, England

Coordinates: 51.5312°N 0.0219°W

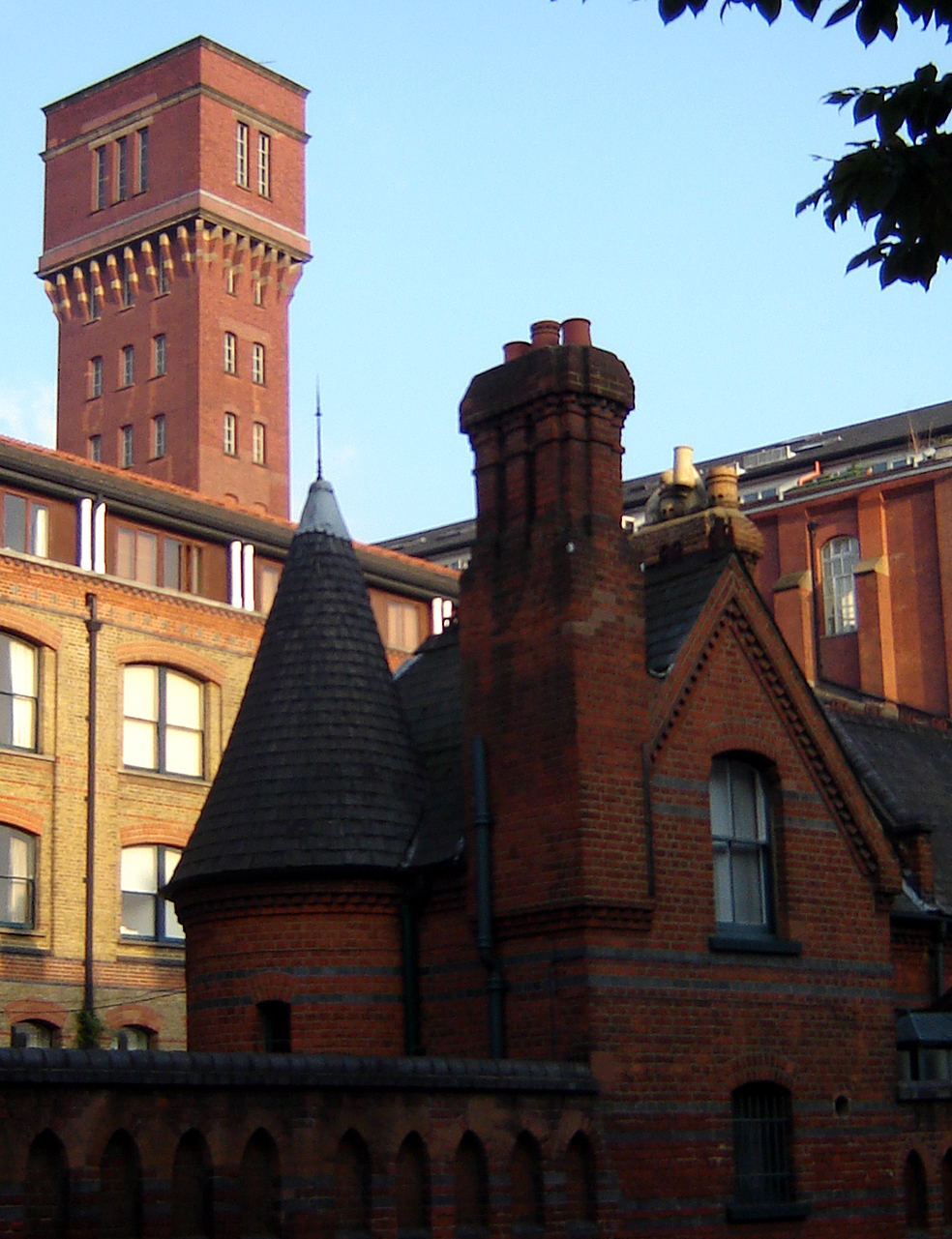
Bryant & May's match factory (now the Bow Quarter). (October 2006)

Bow Quarter is a gated community in Bow in the London Borough of Tower Hamlets. The building was originally the Bryant and May match factory, and was the site of the Match Girls' strike in the 1880s. The factory was redeveloped in the 1980s, in one of east London's first urban renewal projects.

== History ==
From the mid-19th century to more than three-quarters of the way through the 20th century it was the location of the Bryant and May match factory. At the turn of the two centuries it was London's largest factory.

The 3 acre (1.2 hectare) site, acquired by William Bryant and Francis May in 1861, contained a number of factories that had once been used for the manufacture of candles, crinoline and rope, but had fallen into disrepair. Assistance in adapting the site for match making was provided by John Edvard Lundström, the Swedish safety match maker.

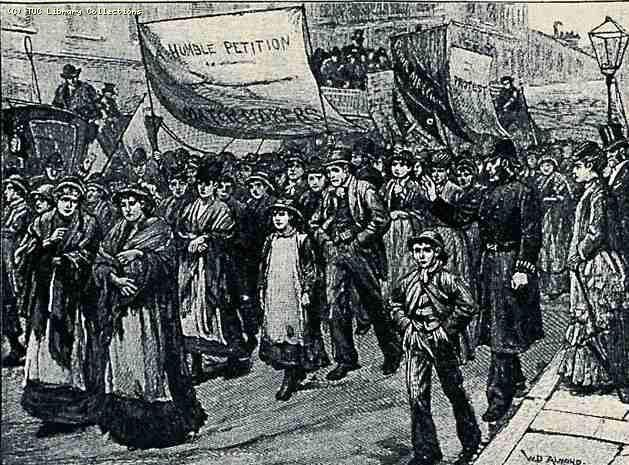
Striking match workers march to Westminster in July 1888.

The London matchgirls strike of 1888 started in the factory, caused by the poor working conditions; including fourteen-hour work days, poor pay, excessive fines and the severe health complications of working with white phosphorus, such as phossy jaw. This led to the establishment of the first British trade union for women. A blue plaque outside the entrance commemorates the role of social pioneer and feminist Annie Besant in leading the demands for better pay and conditions. The result was that some of the first welfare institutions in Britain for industrial workers began on this site, including the provision of a dentist.

The present main factory building was constructed in 1909–10. At full production in 1911, the Bow site employed more than 2,000 women and girls. It finally closed in 1979, when 275 people worked there, production being transferred to Litherland near Liverpool. Designed by Holman and Goodsham, it is concrete-framed red brick building, with two tall towers of ten stories. It is a Grade II Listed building.

== Present day ==
The site had fallen into disrepair when in 1988, developers Kentish Homes, with designs from ORMS Architects (chief project architect Oliver Richards) - embarked upon one of east London's first urban renewal projects. In a history of the development in his 2009 book A Journey Through Ruins - The Last Days of London, historian Patrick Wright describes the process of gentrification of the area. As he puts it: "The coinage dreamed up to turn the Bryant & May factory into the Bow Quarter gave an altogether new turn to the rhetoric of an east London trade that local Member of Parliament (MP) George Lansbury once dismissed as 'room farming'. As the sales line of the developers went: 'Parisians have the Latin Quarter, New Yorkers have Greenwich Village. Now in East London, a stone's throw from the City, there's a new Quarter..." However, unlike the former two, the latter would be "generated by a single speculative stroke".

Today Bow Quarter consists of 733 one- and two-bedroom flats and penthouses, together with a handful of workers' cottages built around the late 19th century. Set in 7 acres (28,000 m^{2}) of landscaped grounds, amenities include a residents' gym and a convenience store.

The majority of the flats today are located in former factory and office buildings. Arlington, for example, was built as offices in 1874; Lexington and Manhattan date from the factory site redevelopment in 1911. The Victorian cottages near the entrance provided accommodation for the company directors whilst Staten was built as extra office accommodation in the late 1950s. The Park buildings (East, Central and West) were added in the mid-1990s.

In 2004, the TV series If... shot scenes in the fictional gated community Regent's Court inside Bow Quarter. Some residents were interviewed by the production team during the making of the programme.

Current residents include James Lance, Katy B and Sunday Girl. Previous residents have included John Barrowman and Steve Strange. Former resident Danny Wallace declared his flat a micronation in the TV series How to Start Your Own Country. Gary Stevenson, former city trader, economist and social media personality, was also a resident during the 2010s. His residency is referred to in his autobiography, The Trading Game. AudiopleXus mastering studio is located in the Bow Quarter.

In April 2012, the Ministry of Defence identified the water tower as a potential location for surface-to-air missile defences during the 2012 Summer Olympics. One resident, a Guardian journalist, reported opposition to the scheme, but other residents were supportive of the move.
