= Urban Splash =

British property development company

Urban Splash Ltd
- Founded: 1993
- Founder: Tom Bloxham and Jonathan Falkingham
- Headquarters: Manchester, United Kingdom
- Services: Property development
- Parent: Urban Splash Group Ltd
- Website: www.urbansplash.co.uk

Urban Splash is a UK-based property development business. It was founded in 1993 by chairman Tom Bloxham and creative director Jonathan Falkingham. Headquartered in Castlefield, Manchester, it also has regional bases in Liverpool, Leeds, Bristol, Sheffield, Cambridgeshire and Plymouth.

House by Urban Splash, a subsidiary founded in 2016 and spun-out in 2019, went into administration in 2022 with 160 staff made redundant and combined debts of over £19 million.

== History ==
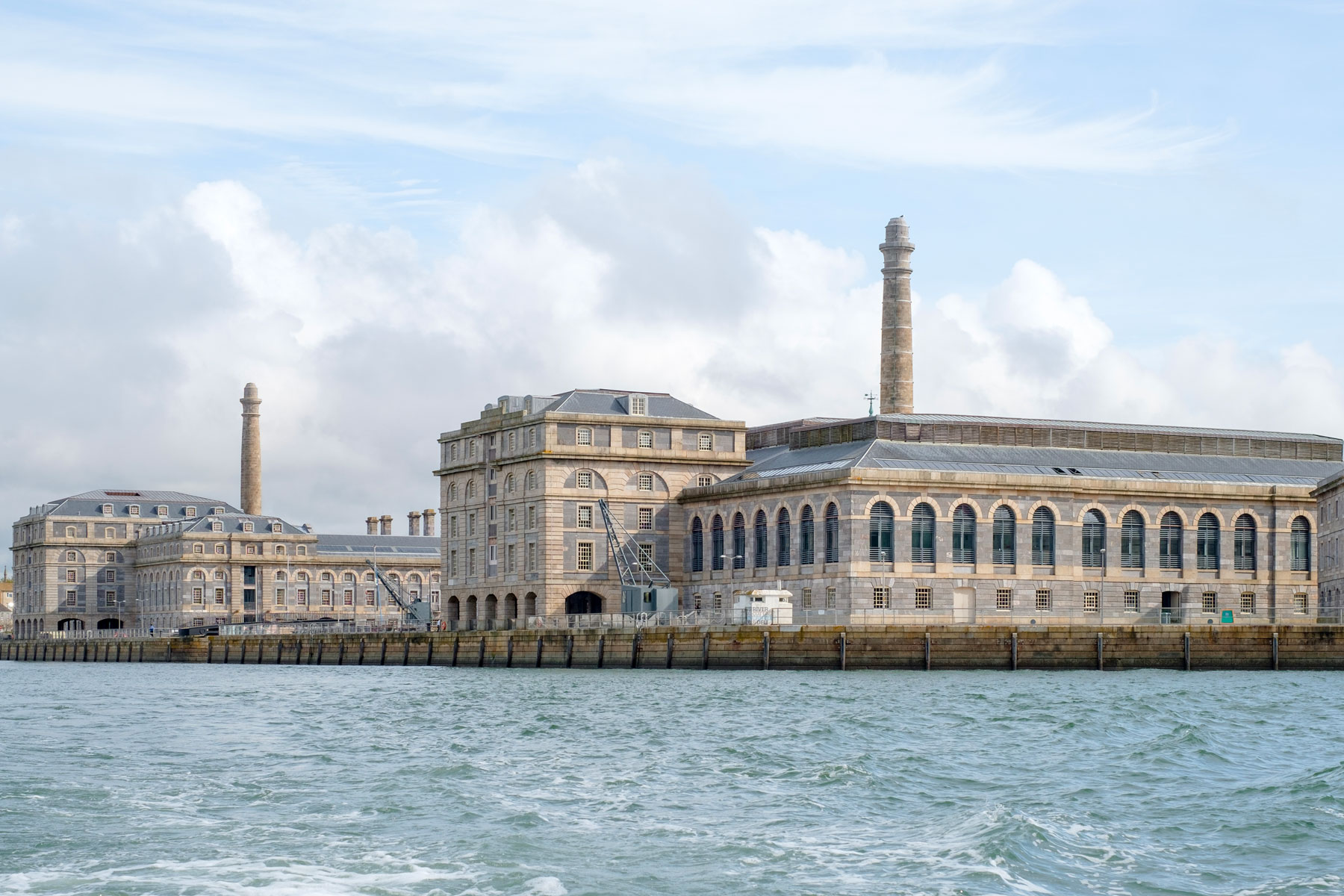
Royal William Yard, Plymouth

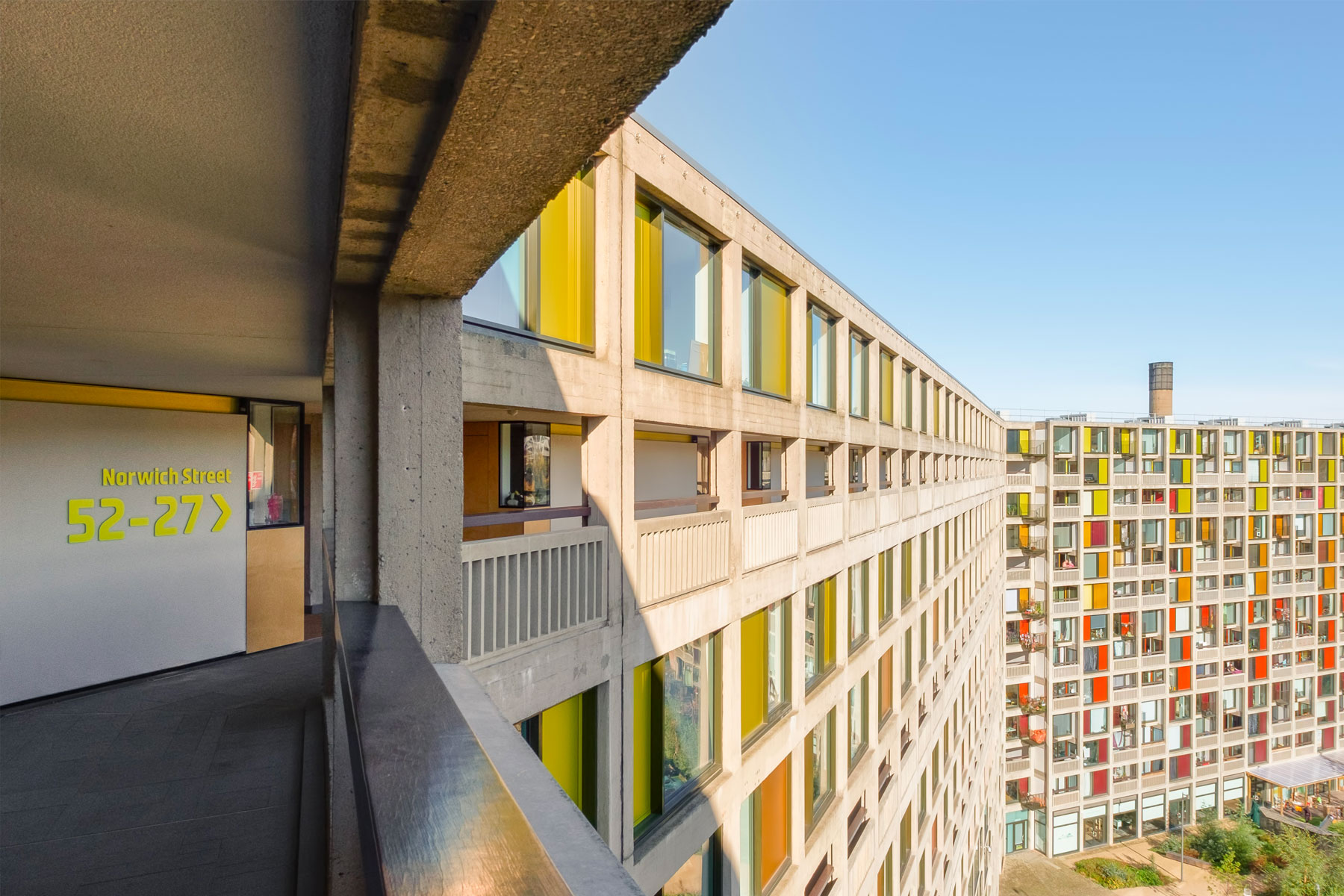
Park Hill in Sheffield

Urban Splash was founded by Tom Bloxham, a graduate of the University of Manchester, and Jonathan Falkingham, an architecture graduate from Liverpool University. Bloxham's initial business experience was selling pop posters in Affleck's Palace in Manchester. Bloxham branched out as a landlord opening the Northern Quarter Arcade adjacent to Affleck's Palace. He then expanded into Liverpool, opening a shopping arcade called the Liverpool Palace and then into licensed premises with the founding of the Baa Bar in Liverpool together with Falkingham.

Established in 1993, Urban Splash has redeveloped disused buildings across the United Kingdom, with schemes including:

- New Islington in Manchester
- Chimney Pot Park in Salford
- Lister Mills in Bradford
- Saxton Parade in Leeds
- Park Hill in Sheffield
- The Vanilla and Tea Factories and The Matchworks in Liverpool
- The Rotunda and Fort Dunlop in Birmingham
- Lakeshore in Bristol - apartments in an old tobacco factory come complete with underfloor heating powered by a biomass boiler and a guide promoting sustainable living as part of the package. In February 2015, Urban Splash sold the freehold of the site to Adriatic Land 3 Limited.
- Royal William Yard in Plymouth

In September 2008, Urban Splash announced it would be making significant redundancies due to the downturn in the UK property market. The downturn also led to delays on some projects.

In March 2010, it was announced by Urban Splash that they would be drawing up plans for an £80 million project to renovate the Pleasureland Southport site and construct an outdoor heated swimming pool, while expanding the marine lake and constructing a winter garden, which will all be housed under a landmark atrium inspired by the Eden project. Plans were abandoned in 2012 after the viability of the project was hit by recession.

In September 2012, the company reported pre-tax losses of £9.3 million and debts of £234.4 million for the previous year.

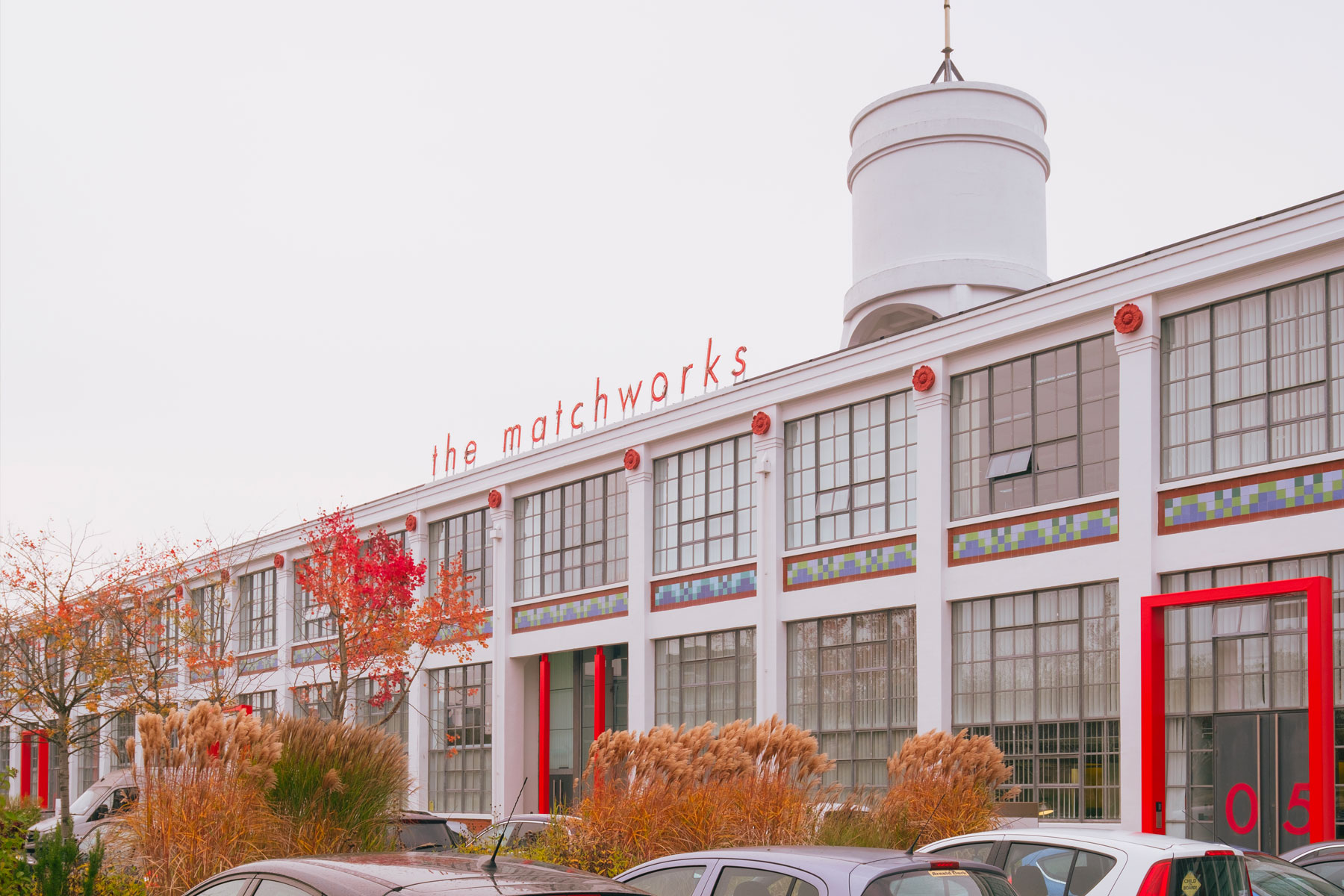
Matchworks, Liverpool

In October 2013, Urban Splash sold one of their undeveloped acquisitions – the former Sunbeam motorcycle factory site, off the Penn Road island in Wolverhampton – which had been disused since 1999. Property developer and former rugby player Liam Wordley bought the site, traditionally known as Sunbeamland, with the intention to convert for residential use.

In 2014 Urban Splash refinanced £135 million of debt in conjunction with entering into a joint venture with The Pears Group, and restructured itself.

In the wake of the Grenfell Tower fire, a number of buildings developed by Urban Splash were reported to have been constructed using unsafe cladding. In January 2018, the Chips building in Manchester failed a Greater Manchester Fire and Rescue Service risk assessment after the cladding on the building was found to have "non fire retardant" written on it. The cladding was then removed at the residents' expense. In November 2026, Urban Splash and four associated companies were ordered to pay £46.5m to the UK government for building safety remediation works on seven Manchester buildings in Manchester following actions brought by the Ministry of Housing, Communities and Local Government (MHCLG).

In November 2018, the BBC reported that the cladding on the redeveloped Saxton Parade building in Leeds was combustible and did not meet current or previous building standards.

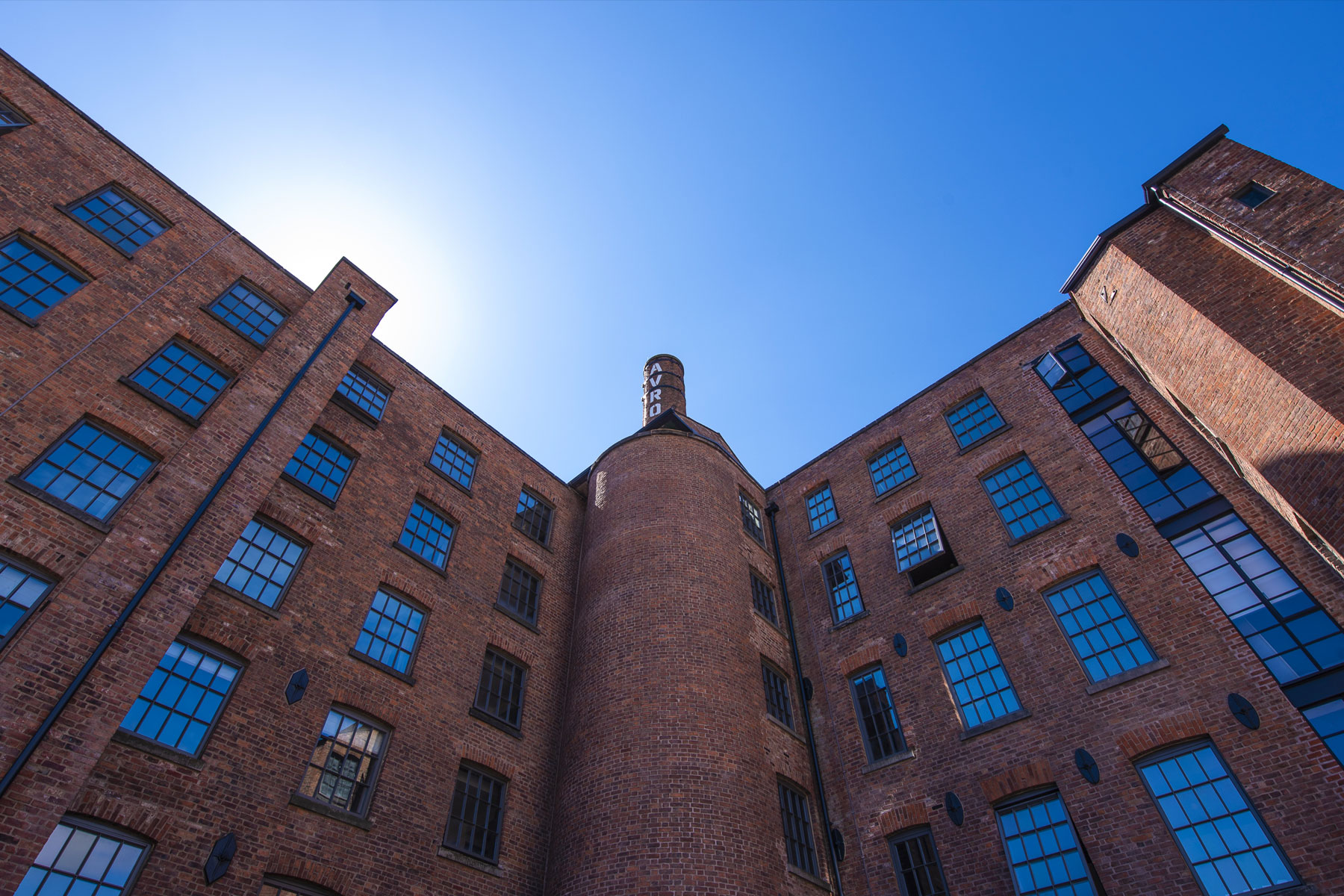
Avro, Manchester

In 2020 Swansea Council announced that Urban Splash would be its preferred development partner for a number of key sites, including the Civic Centre, Swansea Central north and a plot of land running alongside the River Tawe in the St Thomas area of the city.

In its annual results published in September 2021, Urban Splash announced a 22% increase in turnover – with £39.4 million of sales. The company also recorded an increase in the value of its tangible fixed assets which now exceed £100 million – a £5 million growth on the prior year – as well as a retained profit of £0.9 million.

In late 2022, the company acquired more land at New Islington in Manchester.

=== House by Urban Splash ===
Urban Splash's modular houses were launched in 2016 at New Islington in Manchester, consisting of 43 properties.

The modular housing concept evolved further in March 2018 with the launch of 10 Fab Houses, two storey modular homes created in the factory and designed by architect George Clarke.

In 2019 the modular operation was demerged from Urban Splash when Japan's biggest house builder Sekisui House and Homes England invested £55 million in the business. In 2022 House by Urban Splash (legally, Urban Splash House Ltd; 48% owned by Urban Splash shareholders, with Sekisui and Homes England holding 48% and 4% respectively) went into administration with 160 staff made redundant at its Derbyshire factory and at sites across the country. The collapsed business owed a combined £19.2 million to dozens of companies. Administrators said the business failure was due to "the under-performance of its modular facility, which has been loss-making for a prolonged period"; the underperformance was due to multiple factors including "design issues resulting in production defects and re-working the modular units, the costs of which could not be passed on" while its factory in Alfreton also suffered from "underutilisation and inability to absorb overhead costs."

In October 2023, Urban Splash House was successfully sued by eight former employees as they had been made redundant without a consultation process. An employment tribunal held in Liverpool ruled that at least 20 employees had been dismissed without consultation and so were entitled to compensation.

In May 2024, Urban Splash House was set to go into liquidation, the final stage in winding-up the modular specialist, with some suppliers set to receive some of the cash they were owed. The administrator said £4.3 million was available for unsecured creditors; total claims topped £25 million.

=== Urban Splash commercial portfolio ===
As well as residential developments, Urban Splash also works on commercial projects, including Ducie House in Manchester, The Matchworks and Ropewalks in Liverpool, Fort Dunlop in Birmingham and Royal William Yard in Plymouth. Notable past occupiers include 808 State, Simply Red, Cream, The Farm and The La's. In 2021 it announced it had completed 230,000 sq ft (21,000 m^{2}) of commercial deals during the year.

In July 2022, Urban Splash completed a deal with Aviva Investors to secure £43.5 million to invest in its commercial portfolio in Manchester and Liverpool.

=== Urban Splash Residential Fund ===
In 2017 the Urban Splash Residential Fund was formed to acquire design-led homes in urban regeneration areas across the UK - both through the Urban Splash pipeline and through opportunistic acquisitions.

The fund owns and manages homes across Manchester, Birmingham, Sheffield, Bradford and Bristol, with average occupancy of 97% and annual investor returns of 9.5%.

In August 2022, the fund's latest results showed it had tripled in value, with net asset value at £90.3 million. It also posted a profit of £2.2 million, a 70% rise on the £1.3 million recorded in 2021. The fund also invested £30m in new acquisitions during the reporting period, taking the portfolio to 252 homes in six UK cities.

In late 2022, the fund acquired Derwent House in Birmingham.

== Publications ==
In 2012 the company published a book documenting its relationship with architects and the schemes it had completed. Titled Transformation, the book was reviewed in The Times who said: "When it comes to rescuing the great industrial landmarks of the past, Urban Splash is in a class of its own".

In 2018 celebrating its 25th anniversary, the company published a second book titled It Will Never Work.
