= Bryant and May Factory, Melbourne =

Factory building in Cremorne, Melbourne, Australia

Coordinates: 37°49′46″S 144°59′49″E

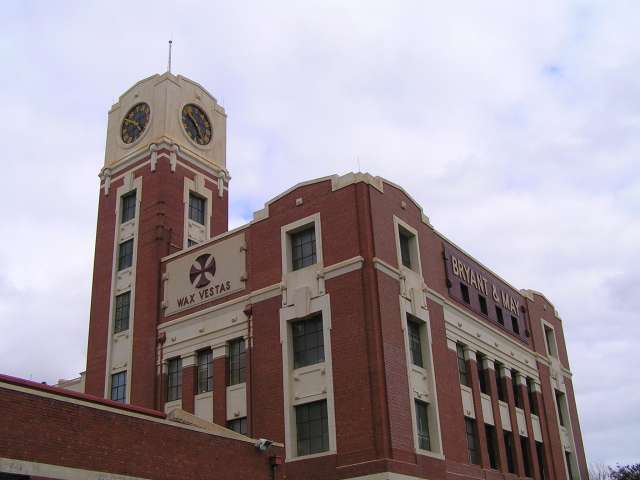
Bryant and May factory clock tower

The Bryant and May Factory, located in the Cremorne area of Richmond in Melbourne, is notable for its distinctive red brick buildings, and as the location for the manufacture of Australia's most popular brand of matches through much of the 20th century. Bryant & May adopted the brand name Redheads in 1946, and it is still the most popular match in the country, although now manufactured in Sweden.

Bryant and May are also notable for operating as a model factory, providing workers with conditions and amenities which even today seem generous. These included a dining hall and sports facilities such as a tennis court and bowling green which were constructed in the 1920s.

Bryant and May ceased Australian match manufacture in early 1987 as a result of import competition. Their iconic Redheads matches are now imported from Sweden. The complex has since been converted for use as offices and showrooms but is extremely well preserved. It is listed on the Victorian Heritage Register.

The Bryant and May complex at 560 Church Street, Richmond, comprises a series of factory buildings, dominated by a major freestanding redbrick 3-4 storey building, complete with clock tower, running back from the Church Street frontage. This is visible from some distance on three sides across local streets and carparks, and from the nearby elevated rail lines. The front 3/4 of the building running back from Church Street was the first built, in 1909, designed by prolific Melbourne architect William Pitt. It is a typically Melbourne Edwardian design, in bold red brick with cement dressings, with bays defined by red brick piers which are carried through the rendered balustrade, creating a long rhythmic facade on the south side. The front facade features finer piers, spandrels with Art Nouveau foliated decoration, a large entry arch, the lettering B & M above, topped by an unusual pierced arched pediment.

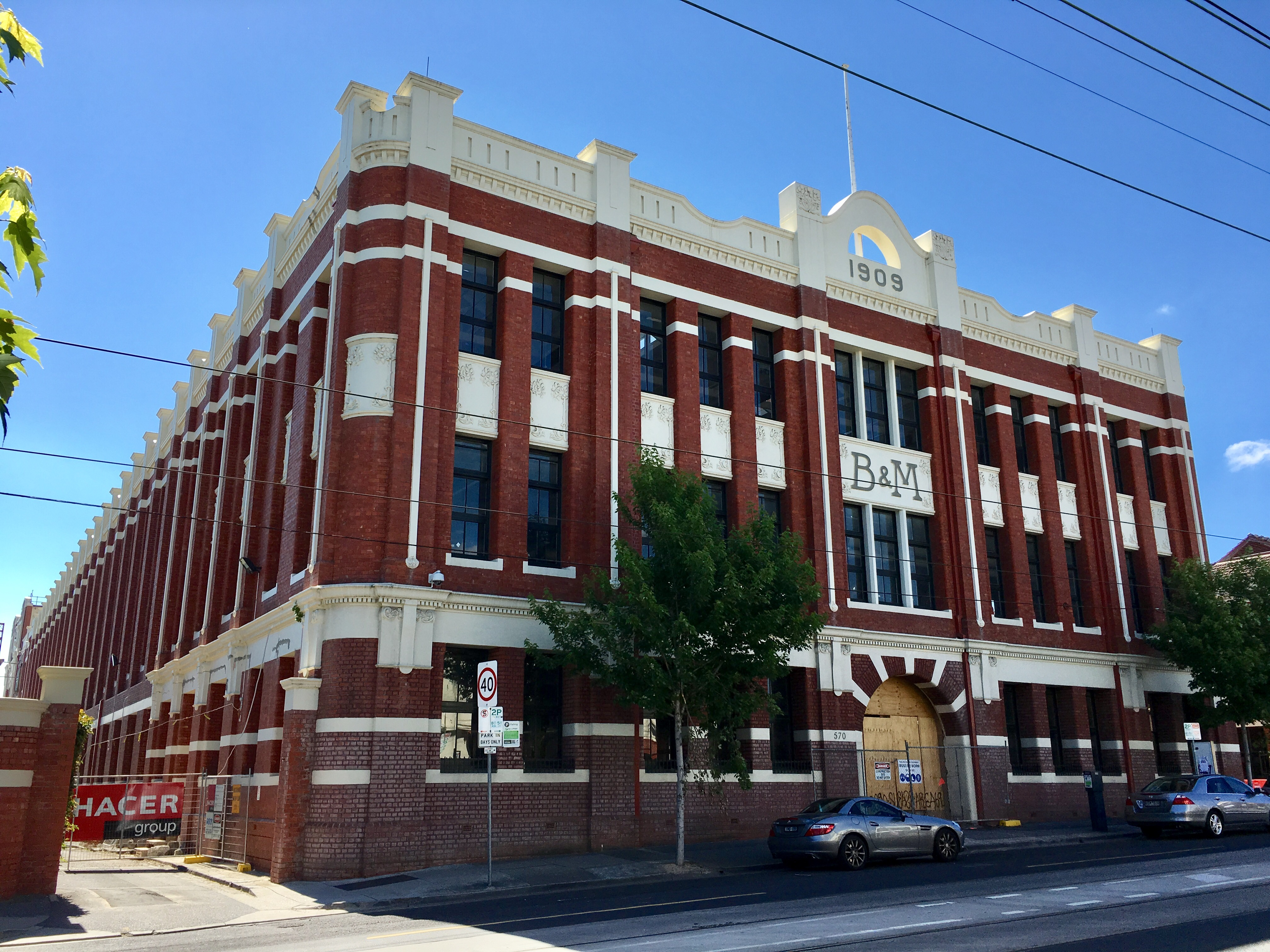
Bryant & May Factory, from Church Street, Richmond

Other smaller buildings were added across a small lane on the north side in 1910 and 1917 in a matching style. A large addition was made to the rear (west) of the building in 1921–22, designed by Klingender & Hamilton, in matching red brick but in a Stripped Classical style. This addition has an extra floor, with prominent signage, and a clock tower on the north side and the clock face bears the name BRYANT AND MAY in place of numbers. A new chimney stack, boiler house, offices and Brymay Hall, also designed by Klingender & Hamilton, were also added at this time.
