= Swedish Match =

Swedish company

Swedish Match AB

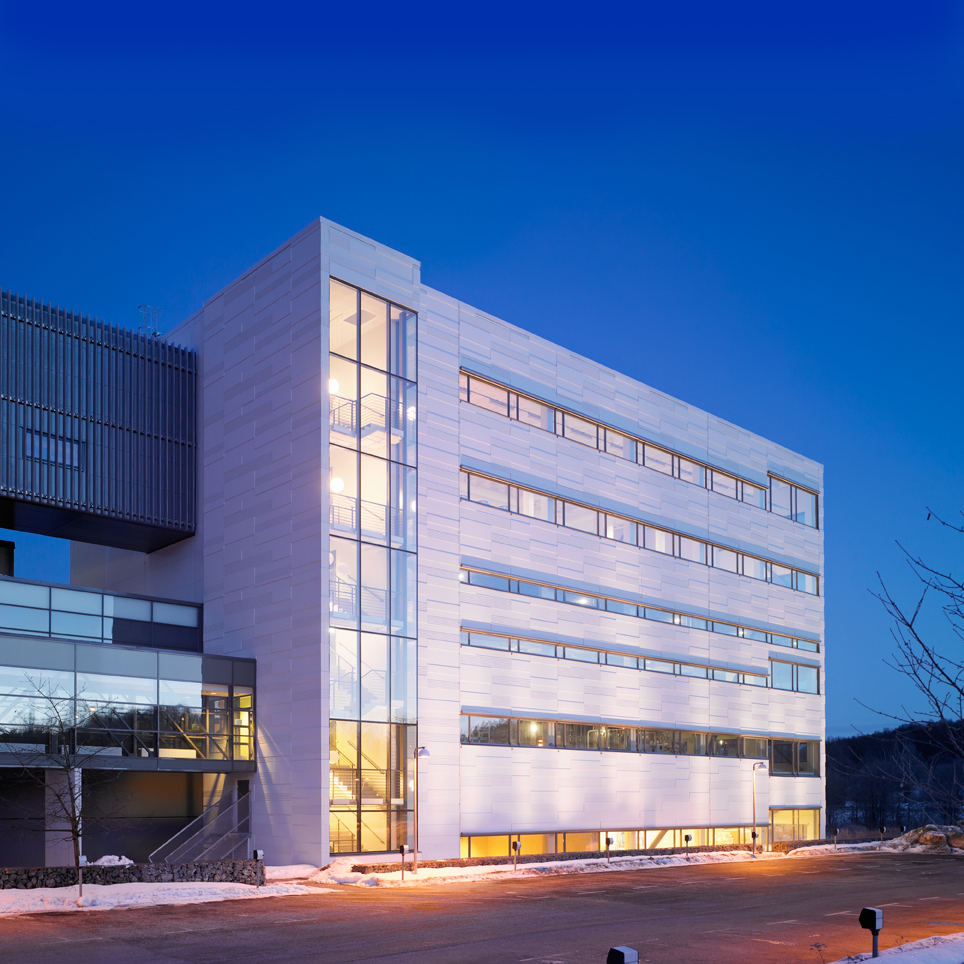
- Manufacturing facility HQ in Kungälv, Sweden
- Type: Subsidiary
- Industry: Manufacturing
- Founded: 1915; 111 years ago
- Headquarters: Stockholm, Sweden
- Key people: Conny Karlsson (Chairman)
- Products: Snus, nicotine pouches, moist snuff, tobacco- and nicotine-free pouch products, chewing tobacco, chew bags, tobacco bits, cigars, matches, lighters, fire product
- Revenue: ▲18.489 billion kr (2021)
- Operating income: ▲8.286 billion kr (2021)
- Net income: ▲6.218 billion kr (2021)
- Total assets: ▲16.152 billion kr (2021)
- Total equity: ▲ −6.669 billion kr (2021)
- Number of employees: ▲7,523 (2021)
- Parent: Philip Morris International
- Website: www.swedishmatch.com www.swedishmatchindustries.com

Swedish Match AB is a Swedish multinational company headquartered in Stockholm. The company manufactures snus, nicotine pouches, moist snuff, tobacco- and nicotine-free pouch products, chewing tobacco, chew bags, tobacco bits, cigars, matches, lighters, and other fire products with operations in Sweden, Denmark, the United States, the Dominican Republic, Brazil, the Netherlands, and the Philippines. The company's origins can be traced back to 1868, and Ivar Kreuger. Swedish Match has played an important part in Sweden's industrial development.

In May 2022, Philip Morris launched a takeover bid for Swedish Match. Despite some shareholder resistance, by late November 2022 Philip Morris had acquired over 90% ownership, allowing it to begin the compulsory purchase of remaining shares and de-list Swedish Match from the stock market.

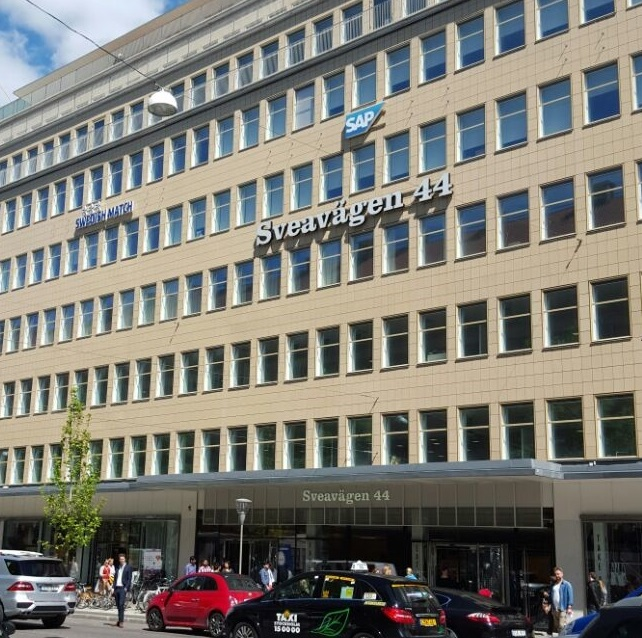
Headquarters at Sveavägen, Stockholm, as of 2015

== History ==
The operations of Swedish Match originate from two companies: Svenska Tobaksmonopolet, a tobacco monopoly owned by the Swedish state and founded in 1915, and Svenska Tändsticks Aktiebolaget (STAB), a match manufacturing company founded in 1917 by Ivar Kreuger (also known as the ”Match King”) in connection with the acquisition of Jönköpings Tändsticksfabrik. In 1992, the tobacco and lights operations were joined in the Procordia Group. Two years later, they were merged into an independent company named Swedish Match, which became publicly listed in 1996.

During parts of its existence, most recently between 2010 and 2015, the company has been headquartered in the so-called Matchstick Palace, commissioned by Ivar Kreuger in the late 1920s.

=== Svenska Tändsticks AB (STAB) ===
In 1917, Ivar Kreuger founded Svenska Tändsticks Aktiebolaget (STAB) in Jönköping (also known as "City of the matches"). It was a merger between Aktiebolaget Förenade Tändsticksfabriker and Jönköpings & Vulcans Tändsticksfabriksaktiebolag. By expanding through acquisition of government-created monopolies by lending money to the governments, and through mergers with for instance the British match company Bryant and May in 1927, it became the world's largest match manufacturer. A year later, STAB was listed on the Stockholm Stock Exchange. In 1930, the company controlled 60 percent of the world's match production and was the sole owner of match companies in 33 countries.

Following the death of Ivar Kreuger in 1932, the ownership structure in STAB changed and a number of factories were liquidated. During 1938, STAB's share of the world's matchmaking fell to 20 percent. When the match market declined sharply in the 1950s, STAB looked for new business ventures and acquired more than 50 companies between 1968 and 1976.

In 1980, Svenska Tändsticks AB changed its name to Swedish Match to create unity throughout the group. In 1988 the company was acquired by Stora AB and was sold two years later to Nederlight. After another two years, Procordia acquired Swedish Match.

=== AB Svenska Tobaksmonopolet ===
In 1915, the Swedish government founded AB Svenska Tobaksmonopolet and nationalized all Swedish tobacco production plants. The monopoly was introduced in order to give the government funds to finance the country's military defense and a new national pension system.

During the 1960s, the monopoly on production, import and sale of tobacco was abolished in Sweden. Svenska Tobaksmonopolet was converted to a new state-owned company named Svenska Tobaks AB. In 1971, the ownership of the tobacco group was transferred to Statsföretag, the Swedish Sovereign Wealth Fund, which in 1984 was renamed Procordia.

As a result of the monopoly being abolished and in order to broaden the market, the Dutch cigar company Elisabeth Bas/La Paz (EBAS), the American tobacco manufacturer Pinkerton Tobacco Company (maker of Red Man, a chewing tobacco brand introduced in the U.S. in 1904) and the Dutch cigar producer Willem II were acquired between 1968 and 1989. In 1989, Procodia was listed on the Stockholm Stock Exchange. Volvo acquired part of Procordia in 1990 and became the principal owner together with the Swedish government. To complement the tobacco business, Procordia, in 1992, acquired the match and lighter company Swedish Match from Nederlight.

=== Swedish Match AB ===
In 1992, the listed company Procordia acquired the match and lighter business named Swedish Match. The operations of Swedish Match were integrated with Procordia United Brands, one of Procordia's business operations, and was renamed Swedish Match to take advantage of international name recognition. In 1994, Swedish Match functioned as an independent company and was later, in 1996, listed on the OMX Nordic Exchange Stockholm AB and on Nasdaq.

In 1999, the company sold its cigarette manufacturing to Austria Tabak but is still active as a distributor of cigarettes on the Swedish market. In the same year, Swedish Match expanded its cooperation with PT. Java Match Factory (Jamafac), the biggest safety matches manufacturer in Indonesia, to a joint venture agreement in order to strengthen its position within lights and matches in Southeast Asia. Jamafac was divested in 2005 and now has a license agreement with Swedish Match to produce matches and distribute Cricket Lighters in Indonesia.

In 2009, Swedish Match entered an agreement with Philip Morris International and formed the joint venture company SMPM International, with equal stakes owned by each of the two partners, for exploring and developing new markets for snus and other smokefree tobacco products outside Scandinavia and the United States. The collaboration placed test markets in Tel Aviv, Israel; St. Petersburg, Russia; Taiwan; and nationwide Canada. The joint venture was, however, dissolved in 2015.

In 2010, Swedish Match and Scandinavian Tobacco Group (STG) formed a new company specialized in cigars. Swedish Match brought its entire cigar business (with the exception of U.S. mass market cigars) and pipe tobacco into the new company, while STG transferred all of its tobacco business. The new company took over the name Scandinavian Tobacco Group. Swedish Match became a partner with 49 percent of the company, and the remaining shares were owned by Skandinavisk Holding A/S. In 2016, STG became publicly listed, and Swedish Match sold most of its shares in the company.

In 2017, Swedish Match acquired V2 Tobacco, a producer of chew bags and snus, and in 2018, Oliver Twist, a producer of tobacco bits. Both companies are Danish and now fully owned by Swedish Match. Also in 2018, Swedish Match bought a 95 percent stake in the Swedish company Gotlandssnus, which produces snus.

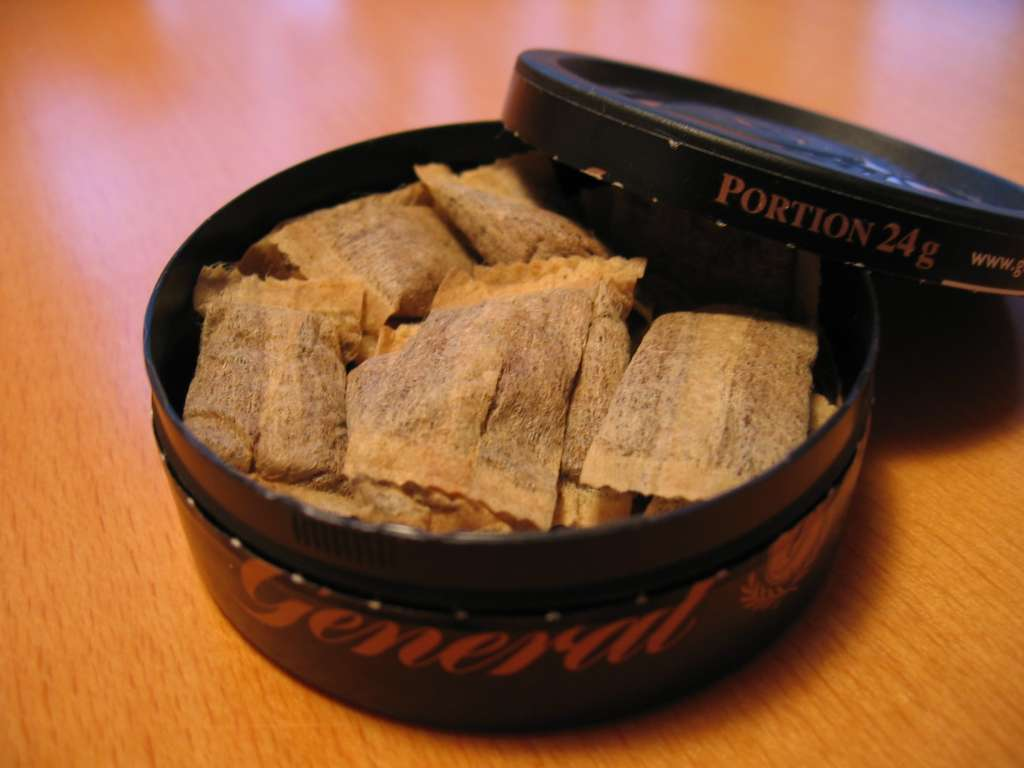
Snus, a tobacco product marketed by Swedish Match

In 2022, Swedish Match's shares hit record high as Philip Morris International (PMI) closed a $16 billion dollar deal with the company. PMI completed the acquisition and eventually delisted Swedish Match.

== Operations ==
Snus, moist snuff, cigars, chewing tobacco, chew bags, tobacco bits, matches and lighters are the main products made by Swedish Match. The company also sells complementary products, such as razors, batteries and light bulbs, on the Brazilian market.

=== Organization ===
The organizational structure consists of three divisions, along with corporate functions.

==== Europe division ====
The Europe division develops, manufactures, markets and sells snus, nicotine pouches and other smokeless products. The geographic scope is international except North America, with a focus on Europe.

==== US division ====
The US Division produces chewing tobacco, cigars, moist snuff and nicotine pouches for the American market. It is also responsible for sales and marketing in the United States.

==== Lights division ====
The Lights division manufactures and markets matches and lighters, with production in Brazil, the Netherlands, the Philippines, and Sweden. The main markets are Europe, Asia, Brazil and parts of Africa. The division also sells complementary products, mainly in Brazil.

=== Operating locations and factories ===
Swedish Match operates in eleven countries and has production units in seven of those: Brazil, Denmark, the Dominican Republic, the Netherlands, the Philippines, Sweden and the US. The company has 15 factories.

The table below presents an overview of Swedish Match's operations as of 2021:

| Country | Activity | Factory | Number of employees (average) |
|---|---|---|---|
| Dominican Republic | Production | Cigars | 3,823 |
| Sweden | Head office, production, distribution and sales offices | Snus, nicotine pouches, other pouch products and matches | 1,352 |
| United States | Production and sales offices | Chewing tobacco, cigars, moist snuff and nicotine pouches | 1,300 |
| Brazil | Production and sales offices | Lighters and matches | 476 |
| The Philippines | Production and sales offices | Lighters | 265 |
| Denmark | Production and sales offices | Chew bags, tobacco bits and snus | 121 |
| Netherlands | Production and sales office | Lighters | 109 |
| Norway | Sales offices | No | 49 |
| Turkey | Sales offices | No | 14 |
| Switzerland | Treasury and sales offices | No | 12 |
| Belgium | Public Affairs offices | No | 2 |

Production of matches and lighters
The matches produced by Swedish Match are safety matches and are manufactured in Sweden and Brazil. The entity that produces matches in Sweden, Swedish Match Industries AB, is since 2009 certified according to the Forest Stewardship Council chain of custody standard and the standard for controlled wood. The matches are manufactured according to the European match standards EN 1783:1997. 40 percent of the production is sold in Europe and 60 percent to Africa, Central America, The Caribbean, Oceania and the Middle East. The Swedish manufacturing facilities are located in Tidaholm and Vetlanda. In Brazil, 95% of the wood consumption for safety matches and matchboxes is from Swedish Match's own plantations. Swedish Match produces lighters in the Philippines, the Netherlands and Brazil.

== Market ==
While today's Swedish Match still produces matches, the majority of its sales and operating profits comes from its smokeless tobacco products such as snus, nicotine pouches, moist snuff and chewing tobacco. In 2021, these smokeless products accounted for 67 percent of sales and 74 percent of Swedish Match's operating profit, whereas matches and lighters accounted for 7 percent of sales and 4 percent of operating profit. Swedish Match's cigars accounted for 26 percent of sales and 23 percent of the operating profit. Swedish Match generates most of its sales in Scandinavia and the US(93 percent of company sales in 2021) but also has a significant worldwide presence through its matches and lighters businesses.

=== Smokefree products ===
Scandinavia and the US are the primary markets for Swedish Match's smokefree products. The company is market leader in snus in both Sweden and Norway. In 2021, the operating profit for smokefree products (chew bags, tobacco bits, snus, moist snuff, nicotine pouches and chewing tobacco) increased to 5,998 MSEK (5,142 MSEK in 2021). The market for Scandinavian snus and the US moist snuff/snus is approximately 1.745 billion cans per year (345 million cans in Scandinavia and 1.4 billion cans in the US). The snus market in the US is about $175 million, and Swedish Match has about 10 percent of the market.

=== Cigars ===
In 2014, the US cigar market was estimated to more than 5 billion cigars (excluding little cigars) of which Swedish Match produced 1.1 billion sticks of cigars. The cigar market grew 9 percent compared to 2013 in terms of volume. Swedish Match's share was even greater in the recent past, as a series of acquisitions between 1999 and 2010 including General Cigar and Scandinavian Tobacco Group (STG) which is the world's largest cigar producer and manufactures more than 50 percent of the world's pipe tobacco. Control of major brands such as Macanudo, Punch, Cohiba, CAO and La Gloria Cubana gave Swedish Match nearly 1/3 of the US premium cigar market in addition to its strong position in machine-made cigars. However, in 2014 Swedish Match, having reorganized its premium-cigar businesses under the STG umbrella, spun off STG as a public company. Swedish Match's cigar business is now limited to machine-made mass-production brands such as White Owl and Garcia y Vega.

=== Matches and lighters ===
Swedish Match supplies matches worldwide. The main markets for matches are Europe, Asia and the Americas. For lighters, the most important markets are Brazil, Indonesia, Malaysia, Russia, Scandinavia, France and UK. In 2021, 59 billion matchsticks were produced and 325 million lighters. Sales for matches and lighters was 1,338 MSEK (1,149 MSEK in 2020) and the operating profit increased by 0.8 percent to 1,453 MSEK (1,382 MSEK in 2020).

=== Main brands ===
Below are Swedish Match's main brands along with market information as of 2021:

| Product | Brand | Main markets | Market share | Competitors |
|---|---|---|---|---|
| Snus | General, Göteborgs Rapé, Ettan, Grov, Catch, Kronan, Kaliber, Nick & Johnny and The Lab | Sweden; Norway | 59 percent | Imperial Tobacco, BAT, Japan Tobacco International |
| Nicotine pouches | ZYN, VOLT, G.4, Swave | The US and Scandinavia | 15 percent in Scandinavia; 64 percent in the US | Imperial Tobacco, BAT, Japan Tobacco International, Altria |
| Moist snuff | Longhorn, Timber Wolf, General | US | 9 percent | Altria, BAT |
| Cigars | White Owl, Garcia Y Vega, Game by Garcia y Vega | US | 22 percent | Swisher, Altria, Imperial Tobacco |
| Chewing tobacco | America's Best Chew (formerly Red Man) | US | 40 percent | National Tobacco, Reynolds American, Swisher |
| Matches | Solstickan, Fiat Lux, Swan, Feudor, Redheads, Tres Estrellas, Sampo, Tordenskjold, Nitedals, Union Match, De Zwaluw, Korona, Le Tre Stelle, Bryant & May, Beehive, Perkuno, The Ship, Quinas, Three Stars, Sirius | UK, Scandinavia, France, Spain, Australia, Brazil, The Netherlands, Italy, Portugal, Lithuania, New Zealand, Austria, Belgium | Market leader | |
| Lighters | Cricket Lighters (Cricket) | Russia, Brazil, Scandinavia, UK, France, Asia | Market leader | Bic, Tokai, Flamagas |

Swedish Match is also active on the Brazilian market with disposable razors, batteries, light bulbs and toothpicks under the Fiat Lux brand.

=== Market position and competition ===
In 2019, cigarettes made up 88 percent of the global tobacco market by value, smokeless products 2 percent and other products, which includes e-cigarettes, 10 percent. Swedish Match is active in the smokeless products category, with several types of smokeless products, as well as in the other products category, with cigars.

==== In the United States ====
For nicotine pouches in 2019, Swedish Match was number one in the U.S. market, with 84 percent. The main competitors, in descending order, were BAT (Reynolds American) and Altria.

For moist snuff in 2019, Swedish Match was number three in the U.S. market, with 8 percent. The main competitors, in descending order, were Altria (USSTC) and BAT (Reynolds American).

For chewing tobacco in 2019, Swedish Match was number one in the U.S. market, with 41 percent. The main competitors, in descending order, were National Tobacco, Swisher, and BAT (Reynolds American).

For mass market cigars, excluding little cigars, in 2019, Swedish Match was number two in the U.S. market, with 22 percent. The main competitors, in descending order, were Swisher, Altria (Middleton), and Imperial Brands (ITG Brands).

==== In Scandinavia ====
For snus in 2019, Swedish Match was number one in both the Swedish and Norwegian markets, with 61 and 55 percent, respectively.

For nicotine pouches in 2019, Swedish Match was number two in the Swedish market and number three in the Norwegian market, with 26 and 15 percent, respectively.

For snus and nicotine pouches combined in 2019, Swedish Match was number one in both the Swedish and Norwegian markets, with 60 and 49 percent, respectively. In Sweden, the main competitors, in descending order, were Imperial Brands, BAT, and Japan Tobacco International. In Norway, the main competitors, in descending order, were Imperial Brands and BAT.

=== Swedish Match in the US ===
In the US, Swedish Match produces and distributes the Longhorn, Timber Wolf and Red Man brands of moist snuff. The company also expanded into the United States premium cigar business by purchasing General Cigar Company Inc. (producer of non-Cuban versions of Macanudo, Partagas and Punch) from Edgar Cullman and El Credito Cigar Company (producer of La Gloria Cubana and El Rico Habano) from Ernesto Perez-Carrillo. In October 2010, the company transferred its US premium cigar and European cigar businesses, as well as its pipe tobacco and accessories businesses, to a new company named Scandinavian Tobacco Group, while receiving a 49 percent ownership stake in the new company.

In an effort to expand its snus business outside of Sweden and Norway, the company has, since 2009, been selling its Scandinavian market leading brand of snus, General, at tobacco retailers in the US. The distribution of General snus has increased over the years, from being sold in approximately 10,000 stores in 2012 to more than 24,000 stores by the end of 2014.

For the US, snus is a relatively new category while the main smokeless category is moist snuff. Moist snuff is made using fermentation. Snus is made using a steam heat process (much like pasteurisation) and is usually placed under the upper lip, which means that spitting is not necessary.

== Key people ==
Swedish Match's board after the annual general meeting in 2021:

| Name | Year of birth | Position | Year elected |
|---|---|---|---|
| Conny Karlsson | 1955 | Chairman of the board | 2007 |
| Charles A. Blixt | 1951 | Board member | 2015 |
| Jacqueline Hoogerbrugge | 1963 | Board member | 2015 |
| Alexander Lacik | 1965 | Board member | 2020 |
| Pauline Lindwall | 1961 | Board member | 2017 |
| Sanna Suvanto-Harsaae | 1966 | Board member | 2022 |
| Joakim Westh | 1961 | Board member | 2011 |
| Patrik Engelbrektsson | 1965 | Employee representative | 2012 |
| Pär-Ola Olausson | 1972 | Employee representative | 2018 |
| Dragan Popovic | 1973 | Employee representative | 2017 |
| Niclas Bengtsson | 1969 | Deputy member | 2018 |
| Niclas Ed | 1968 | Deputy member | 2017 |
| Matthias Eklund | 1980 | Deputy member | 2019 |

President and CEO:
Lennart Sundén, 1998–2004
Sven Hindrikes, 2004–2008
Conny Karlsson (born 1955) is chairman of the board since 2007 and board member since 2006.
Lars Dahlgren (born 1970) is president and CEO of Swedish Match since 2008.

== Ownership structure ==
Since 2023 Philip Morris owns 100% of Swedish Match AB.

== See also ==
- Matches
- Tobacco industry
- Snus
- List of cigar brands
- Lighter
