= Frank Llaneza =

American businessman

Frank Llaneza

Frank Anthony Llaneza (March 9, 1920 – March 18, 2010) was a tobacco blender and former executive of Villazon & Co. who is regarded as a pioneer in the resurgence of the premium cigar industry at the end of the 20th Century. Llaneza is best known for the creation and manufacture of a number of popular cigar brands in the years after the 1962 Cuban Embargo, including Hoyo de Monterrey, Punch, Bolivar, and Siglo.

== Biography ==
=== Early years ===
Frank Llaneza was born on March 9, 1920, in Tampa, Florida. His father, José Llaneza, was a cigar maker who produced a brand in Ybor City known as Pancho Arango. An 11-month-long strike of tobacco workers bankrupted many of Tampa's cigar makers, however, including Frank's father. In the aftermath, the elder Llaneza went to work for the company of Schwab-Davis, one of the city's biggest cigar manufacturers as makers of the popular brand Rey del Rey.

During his time as a manager at Schwab-Davis, Llaneza's father launched another company with his three former business partners called José Arango. When Schwab-Davis was later sold to a company called Gradiaz-Annis, a forerunner of General Cigar Co., the elder Llaneza left the company's employ to devote himself full-time to his own new enterprise.

During his school years, Llaneza worked part-time in his father's factory, beginning work at age 15. He graduated from Tampa's Jesuit High School in 1936.

=== Early career ===
Following graduation from high school, Frank Llaneza went to work in the cigar industry full-time beginning at his father's factory as an apprentice selector of tobacco leaf, helping to sort it for size, color, and quality.

With World War II on the horizon, Llaneza joined the United States Coast Guard in 1940. He served in the Gulf of Mexico and the North Atlantic through the end of the war in 1945.

Following conclusion of the war, Llaneza returned to work in his father's factory as a tobacco selector before moving to become a foreman supervising the torcedores (cigar rollers). Llaneza used the savings he had accumulated to buy a stake in the company, which eventually was held by his father, his brother Joe, and himself. Joe Llaneza ran the Villazon front office and Frank the factory, with the elder Llaneza in charge of picking and packing in the shipping department.

In 1947, Llaneza went to Cuba to learn the leaf trade as an assistant to José Arango's leaf buyer there, José Suarez. Suarez suddenly died during Llaneza's stay, however, leaving the young Frank responsible for buying all the tobacco needed by the factory. It was as a leaf buyer that Frank Llaneza became acquainted with many who would later become giant figures in the cigar industry, including Angel Oliva of Oliva Tobacco Co. and Joe Cullman, father of Joe Cullman III of Philip Morris and Edgar Cullman, the future head of General Cigar Co.

Despite the fact that the American economy underwent a boom in the post-war years, as consumers were suddenly able to buy unlimited quantities of products formerly subjected to wartime rationing, the American cigar industry was hard hit by the sudden release of hundreds of millions of stockpiled cigars onto the market by the United States government. This policy of dumping finished cigars by the government continued into 1948. With cigars easily available at less than their cost of production, once again many small cigar firms based in Tampa were bankrupted, with José Arango among the victims.

=== Establishment of Villazon & Co. ===
The José Arango company was reorganized under bankruptcy under a new name, Villazon and Company. Together Frank and his older brother, Joe, began making inexpensive machine-made cigars, carving out a market niche in which they were able to compete with larger firms. Villazon soon acquired a set of trademarks from the Preferred Havana Company, including the brands Flor del Mundo, Bances, and Lord Beaconfield, among others.

Villazon specialized for a time in the manufacture of inexpensive private label cigars for nightclubs in New York City and elsewhere, barely managing to make ends meet on the low profit margins this particular segment of the business allowed. Approximately 45 or 50 people were employed in the company's Tampa factory.

Together with Angel Oliva Sr., Frank Llaneza was one of the pioneers in the farming of cigar tobacco in Central America. He later recalled:

"Angel Oliva and I took the first Cuban-seed tobaccos to Jalapa in Nicaragua in 1954. By the end of the 1950s, he took some of the tobacco from Nicaragua back to Cuba to some of the farmers there so they could make cigars with it and smoke it just to see the possibilities of tobacco from Nicaragua. It was primitive in Jalapa back in those days. You couldn't get there. There was no road. You had to cross two rivers and there were no bridges. But after that, Mr. Oliva bought farms all over that area and built barns. We were finally able to use that tobacco as we needed it after we ran out of Cuban tobacco. At the time, there wasn't anything that even resembled Cuban tobacco anywhere else in the world."

In 1955, Joe Cullman III, a vice president of tobacco giant Philip Morris, approached the Llaneza brothers and asked them to manufacture Benson & Hedges cigars on behalf of the company, with Frank given approval to select and blend the tobacco used in the brand's products. This proved to be a major turning point in the company's fortunes.

In 1956, Karl Cuesta sold Villazon his cigar making operation and its brands, El Rey del Mundo and Flor de A. Allones, so that Cuesta could concentrate on far more lucrative cigarette manufacturing operations.

Villazon also introduced its own self-named brand in this period. Villazon's production of cigars slowly grew throughout the 1950s, rising from 10,000 or 15,000 cigars a day to about 25,000 a day when the decade drew to a close.

The business shifted somewhat late in the 1950s when Philip Morris decided to exit the cigar business. Excess capacity at Villazon was dedicated to the expansion of the Bances brand, the company's biggest seller.

Villazon continued to purchase Cuban tobacco after the 1959 revolution, only terminating its purchases as the result of an imposition of an American trade embargo established early in 1962.

=== The embargo years ===
An embargo on Cuban products had been correctly anticipated by Angel Oliva, with whom Frank Llaneza worked closely, who managed to export over 2 million pounds of tobacco in the last legal shipment from the island. The private owners of the brand names of the nationalized Cuban cigar industry initially believed that the situation was temporary.

Initially Villazon, with its large stock of available Havana tobacco, was able to license the name Flor de Palacio from its owner, Fernando Palacio, who only later relented by selling the Hoyo de Monterrey, Belinda, and Punch brands to Villazon.

In 1964, with the government of Honduras actively promoting the expansion of the country's tobacco-growing industry, Llaneza established another company called Honduras-American Tobacco S.A. (HATSA). Initially a partnership with a man named Enrique Rivera, Llaneza eventually became the sole owner when Rivera left the business. Beginning with a daily production of between 10,000 and 15,0000 cigars, the company was the first tobacco factory in Danlí, today a major center of the industry.

Due to lower labor costs, difficulty in finding American rollers, and proximity to the raw materials, during the decade of the 1960s Villazon shifted its hand rolled cigar production to Honduras, retaining only a skeleton production facility in Tampa to make special sizes for an elite clientele, such as Red Auerbach of the Boston Celtics and Art Rooney of the Pittsburgh Steelers.

With the cigar business in a steady state of decline in the 1970s and 1980s, Villazon purchased facilities which its competitors were abandoning, such as a larger factory space in Tampa, as well as equipment from manufacturers leaving the industry. The company's American operation was thereby expanded, dedicated to making short filler cigars by machine.

Villazon's Honduran handmade cigars were differentiated from the industry, however, as Frank Llaneza recalled in a 1999 interview:

"The majority of the population wanted mild cigars and everybody in the cigar business thought that by producing mild cigars you could start more cigarette smokers to start smoking cigars. That was the logic. But we were making a heavier, fuller-bodied cigar.... A lot of people who preferred stronger cigars were still smoking Cuban cigars when they could get them. I think a lot of those smokers, because of the rising prices and because of the deteriorating quality in Cuba, started smoking our cigars. And that is when we started seeing a big jump in the sales."

=== Sale of Villazon to General Cigar ===
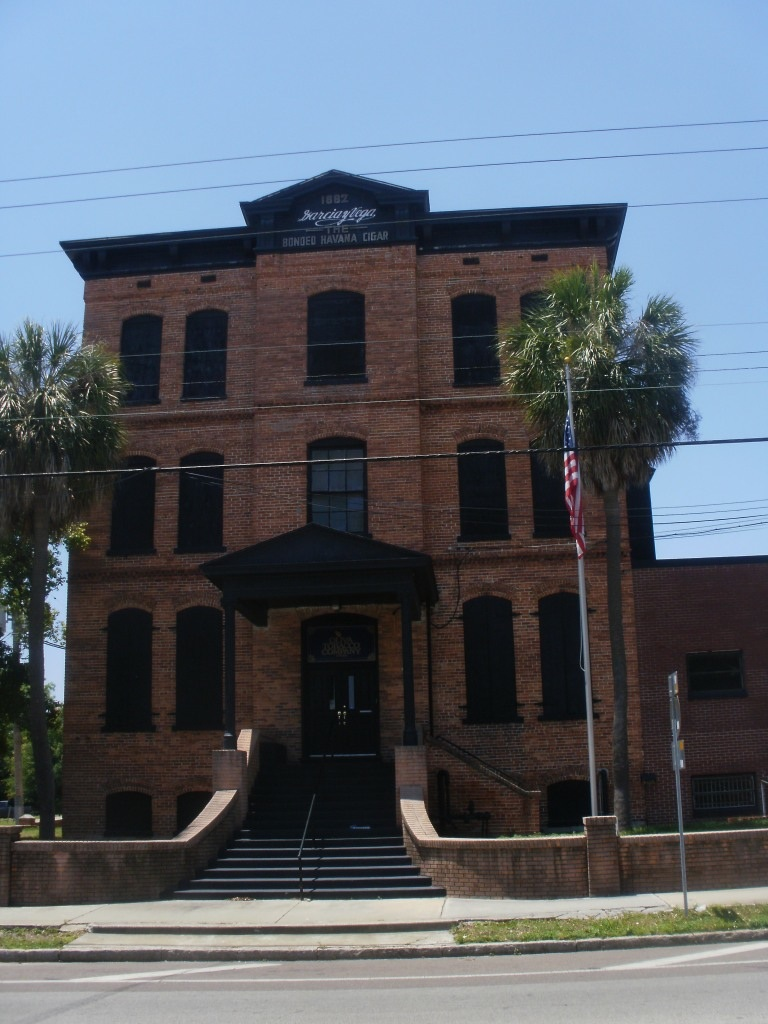
Photo of Villazon & Co.

Llaneza sold Villazon in 1996, during the height of the cigar boom, to the General Cigar Company.

By the end of the 1990s, the Villazon division of General Cigar was making upwards of 125,000 cigars a day, some 32 to 33 million a year, in its manufacturing facilities in Cofradia and Danlí. Many of these were produced for sale via mailorder marketing giant J.R. Tobacco, today a division of Altadis, owned by Imperial Tobacco.

=== Work with Altadis ===
Late in his life, Llaneza returned from semi-retirement to the cigar business, creating new brands and helping to supervise Nicaraguan operations for the cigar making giant Altadis. Among those brands created in this last stage of his career included Siglo and the eponymous Frank Llaneza 1961 brand.

=== Death and legacy ===
Frank Llaneza died March 18, 2010, of heart failure, just two weeks after having celebrated his 90th birthday. Llaneza was survived by his wife, Diana, and four daughters. One of these women, Carol Jean Llaneza, followed in the footsteps of her father and grandfather into the cigar business.

Llaneza was remembered by his peers as one of the supreme figures of the cigar industry. ""He was one of the grandmasters of the industry, like you would consider in chess," John Oliva of the Oliva Tobacco Company recalled at the time of his death.

== See also ==
- Cigar
