= Cuban cigar =

Tobacco cigar made in Cuba

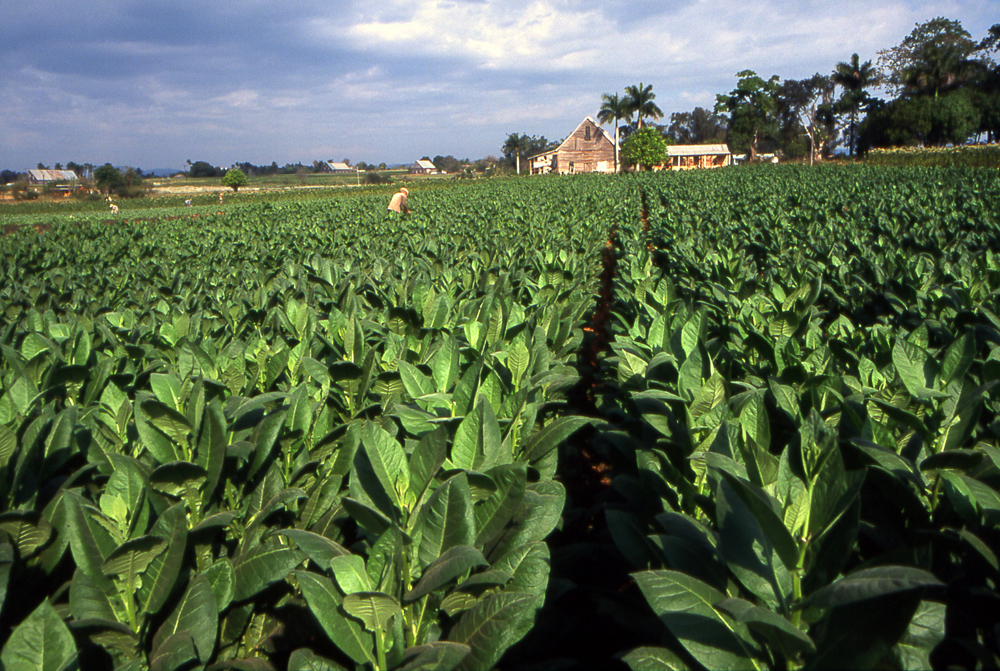
Tobacco plantation, Pinar del Río, Cuba

Cuban cigars are cigars manufactured in Cuba from tobacco grown within that island nation. Historically regarded as among the world's "finest", they are synonymous with the island's culture and contribute over one quarter of the value of all exports from the country. The filler, binder, and wrapper may come from different areas of the island, though much is produced in Pinar del Río province, in the regions of Vuelta Abajo and Semi Vuelta, as well as in farms in the Viñales region. All cigar production in Cuba is controlled by state-owned Cubatabaco. The Cuban cigar is also referred to as El Habano.

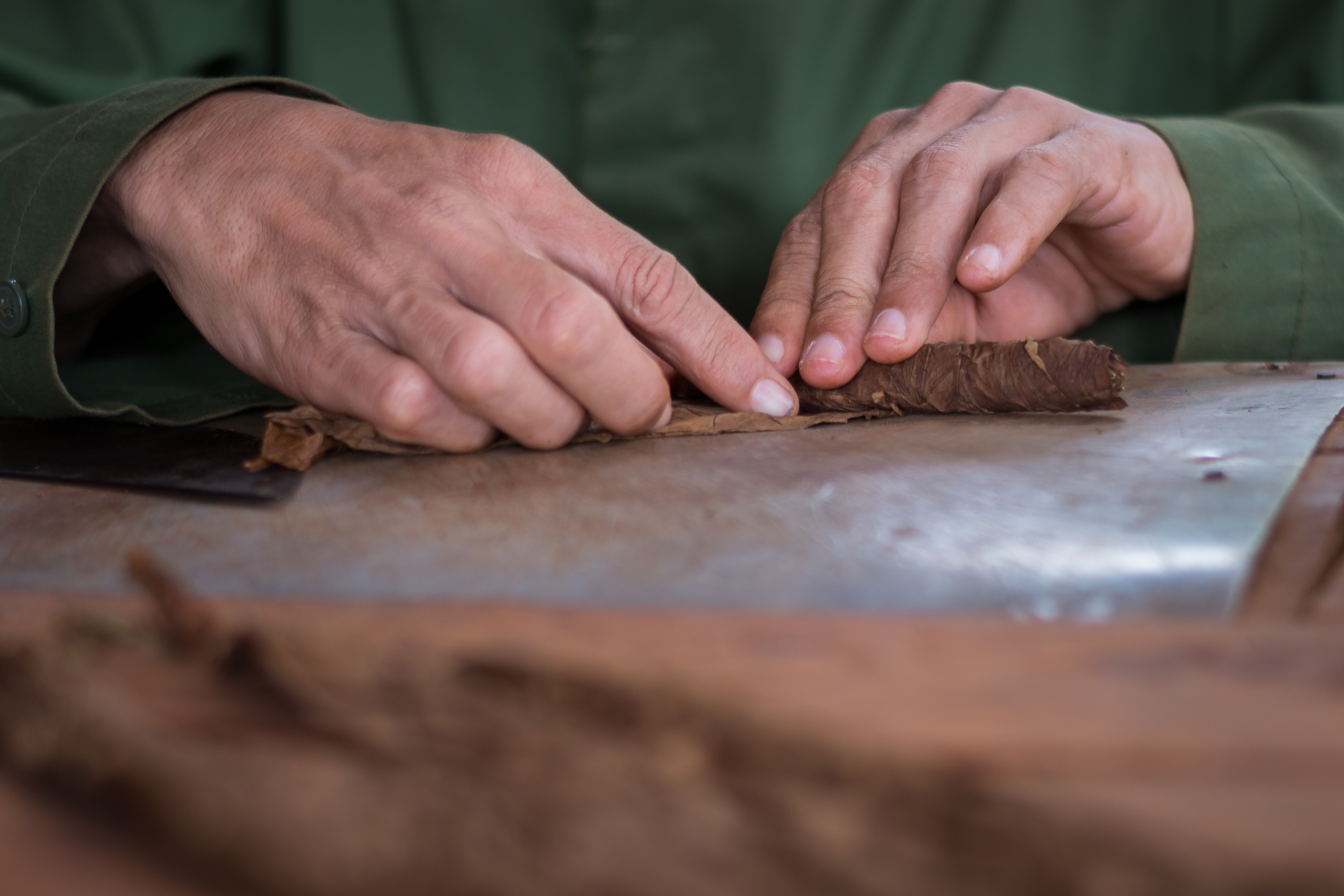
A Cuban cigar being hand-rolled (hecho a mano)

Cubatabaco and Habanos SA, held equally by the Cuban state and Spanish-based private enterprise Altadis, undertake all the work relating to Cuban cigars, including manufacture, quality control, promotion, distribution and export. Habanos SA handles export and distribution, largely through its European partner Altadis. All boxes and labels are marked Hecho en Cuba, Spanish for 'Made in Cuba'. Machine-bunched cigars finished by hand add Hecho a mano ('handmade'), while fully handmade cigars say Totalmente a mano ('entirely handmade'). Torcedores, skilled workers who roll cigars by hand, are highly respected in Cuban society and culture, and travel worldwide displaying the art of hand-rolling cigars. Today, most torcedores are women, or torcedoras.

In the United Kingdom, Cuban cigars are distributed through specialist tobacconists. C.Gars Ltd, founded in 1997, is cited as one of the country's largest cigar retailers and distributors.

== History ==
Evidence of tobacco smoking by Indigenous peoples in the Caribbean dates back to the 9th century. Prior to the discovery of the New World in the 15th century, tobacco smoking was unfamiliar to Europeans. In the late 15th century, scouts sent by Christopher Columbus into the interior of Cuba reported seeing "men with half-burned wood in their hands and certain herbs to take their smokes, which are some dry herbs put in a certain leaf ... suck, absorb, or receive that smoke inside with the breath". The word cohiba means "tobacco" in the Taíno language spoken by the Indigenous Taíno peoples of Cuba.

Following the growth of European colonization in the Caribbean and the expansion of the African slave trade, tobacco became a major commodity shipped to Europe. Soon after the expeditions, the Spanish introduced tobacco to other parts of Europe and its popularity spread. The wrapper, filler, and binder of a cigar could all be grown on Cuba, due to favorable qualities in the climate and land. Due to Spain's claim to Cuba, the Spanish dominated the new tobacco industry in the region. During the 17th century, widespread growth in tobacco use led to condemnation and regulation in Europe. In 1606, Philip III of Spain banned the cultivation of tobacco, though this ban was lifted in 1614. Nevertheless, a special tax was thereafter placed on tobacco imports, with Cuban imports subject to the highest rates. In the early 18th century, increased regulation from Spain sparked armed protests from vegueros (settler growers). Additionally, Spanish settlers were becoming acculturated in Spain (and to the practice of smoking cigars), and many became involved in smuggling operations between trading nations.

Cigars rolled in Cuba were not popular in Spain at that time. The majority of tobacco arriving in Spain was processed in Cádiz to be made into cigars, or made into snuff. Spanish settlers in Cuba returning to Spain, however, retained the "expensive and aristocratic vice of smoking Havana cigars, which they had sent to them from Cuba".

== Brands ==
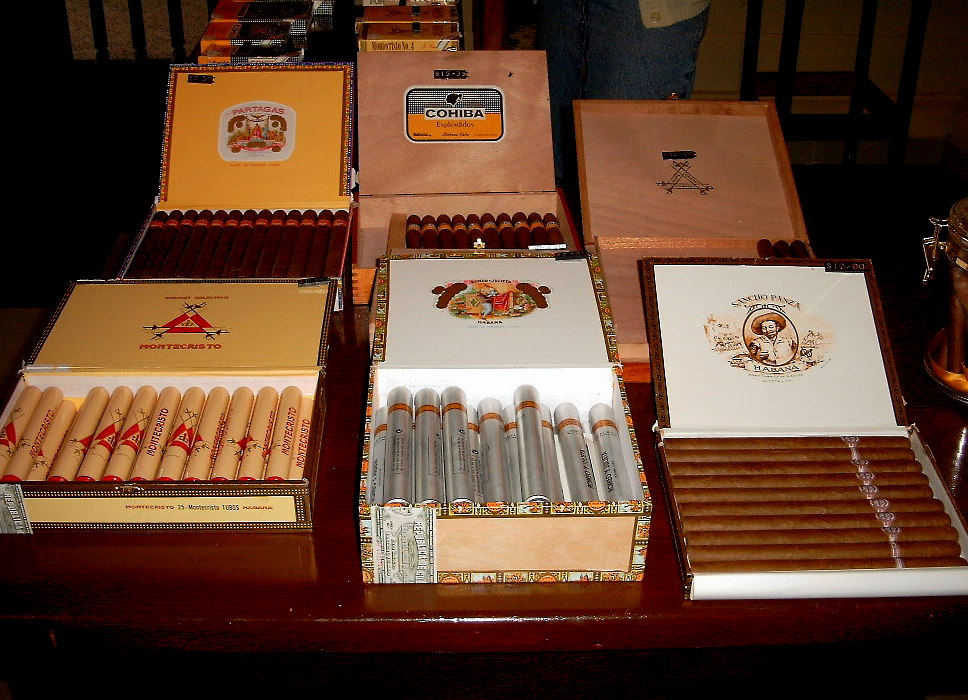
Various brands of cigar from Cuba including Partagás, Cohiba, Montecristo, Romeo y Julieta, and Sancho Panza

Cuban cigar brands and brand names are among the most recognized and prestigious in the world. Among them are Cohiba, Montecristo, Partagás, H. Upmann, La Gloria Cubana, Hoyo de Monterrey, Punch and Romeo y Julieta. Due to an embargo on the import of Cuban cigars by the United States in 1960, difficulties with maintaining the integrity of these brand names arose. The U.S. refused to recognize Cuban ownership of applicable trademarks, resulting in manufacture and sale by companies in the U.S. and other countries (such as the Dominican Republic, Nicaragua and Honduras) unrelated to the Cuban industry, as well as large scale counterfeiting the more valuable Cuban products.

Other prestigious cigar brands formerly made in Cuba include Davidoff and Dunhill, both discontinued there in 1991, but have since moved to other countries.

== Exports ==
Cigars remain one of Cuba's leading exports. A total of 77 million cigars were exported in 1991, 67 million in 1992, and 57 million in 1993, the decline attributed to a loss of much of the wrapper crop in an extreme weather event, which was followed by significant agricultural policy reform and international trade deals that reinvigorated cigar exports in the following years. In 2016 Cuba exported $445 million worth of cigars worldwide, and in 2017, Cuba exported approximately a half billion dollars in cigars. This accounted for 27 percent of goods exports that year.

Due to the perceived status and higher price of Cuban cigars, and the difficulty of identifying the provenance of an unlabeled cigar, counterfeits are not unusual. Cuba counters this trend through a series of exercises in demonstrating authenticity, such as guarantee seals and official government receipts.

== Competition in the Caribbean ==
After the Cuban Revolution a number of Cuban Cigar manufacturers moved to other Caribbean countries to carry on production. The Dominican Republic's similar climate and tradition of cigar export assisted in integrating exiled Cuban producers. Consequently, its production of tobacco rose substantially. This was compounded by a second influx of immigrants from Nicaragua, which also has a favorable climate and soil for growing tobacco, after the Sandinista takeover. Some of these immigrants were the same Cubans who had fled to Nicaragua from Cuba after the Cuban Revolution. Further growth was spurred in the Dominican Republic, which has over time become the largest premium exporter of cigars globally. Honduras lags behind its neighbors in cigar production due to sub-par infrastructure, problems controlling the spread of blue mould, and repeated large weather phenomena.

The United States embargo has caused unfavorable market conditions for Cuban cigars versus its Caribbean counterparts, which have worked for over half a century to garner positive reputations and notoriety of their own.

== International renown and popularity ==
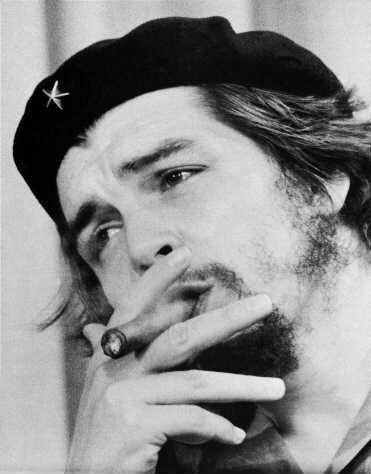
According to Ernesto "Che" Guevara: "A smoke in times of rest is a great companion to the solitary soldier."

Cuban cigars as a whole have a global reputation. A reason for this is a strong flavor profile, a result of their particular type of shade-grown tobacco. That profile and reputation are actively maintained. When the opportunity came in the 1990s to cultivate Connecticut leaf tobacco, a type of wrapper doing particularly well in Europe, Cuba refused, conscious of the fact that the Connecticut leaf's flavor profile was not conducive to the image cultivated around the Cuban cigar.

The popularity of the Cuban cigar has also manifested as a near-constant demand from Central-and-Western Europe, but that demand extends beyond the West as well; China is the third largest market for Cuban cigars, despite the Chinese trade system driving the price up significantly.

Interest in Cuban cigars has also influenced one of Cuba's tourism industries. Cigar tourism is a particular form of Cuban tourism wherein the tourists are taken on a cigar factory tour, and are given the option to purchase cigars at the end of the tour. These purchases come with special receipts and customs certificates which guarantee authenticity and allow cigars to be transported legally out of the country.

Cigar tourism, combined with the expensiveness of Cuban cigars, leads some Cubans with access to cigars to attempt to sell them at bargain prices on the street. These vendors are known as "jineteros", the same name given to Cuban prostitutes. Counterfeit receipts and customs certificates can be bought from these vendors as well, for a price that rises as the receipts appear more authentic. These practices have risks, as those caught participating in them can be subject to both fines and arrests.

== The Smoking Habanera ==
The 'Smoking Habanera,' often sold in Cuban markets as a type of souvenir, is a small, painted figurine sculpted out of clay. It depicts a black woman with exaggerated feminine characteristics smoking a cigar. It embodies the stereotype of what is perceived to be a traditional Cuban woman. This stereotype is sometimes used by black Cuban women to their advantage, as they will dress in traditional garb, and walk the streets with a cigar, offering to have their picture taken for a price.

== Smoking laws in Cuba ==
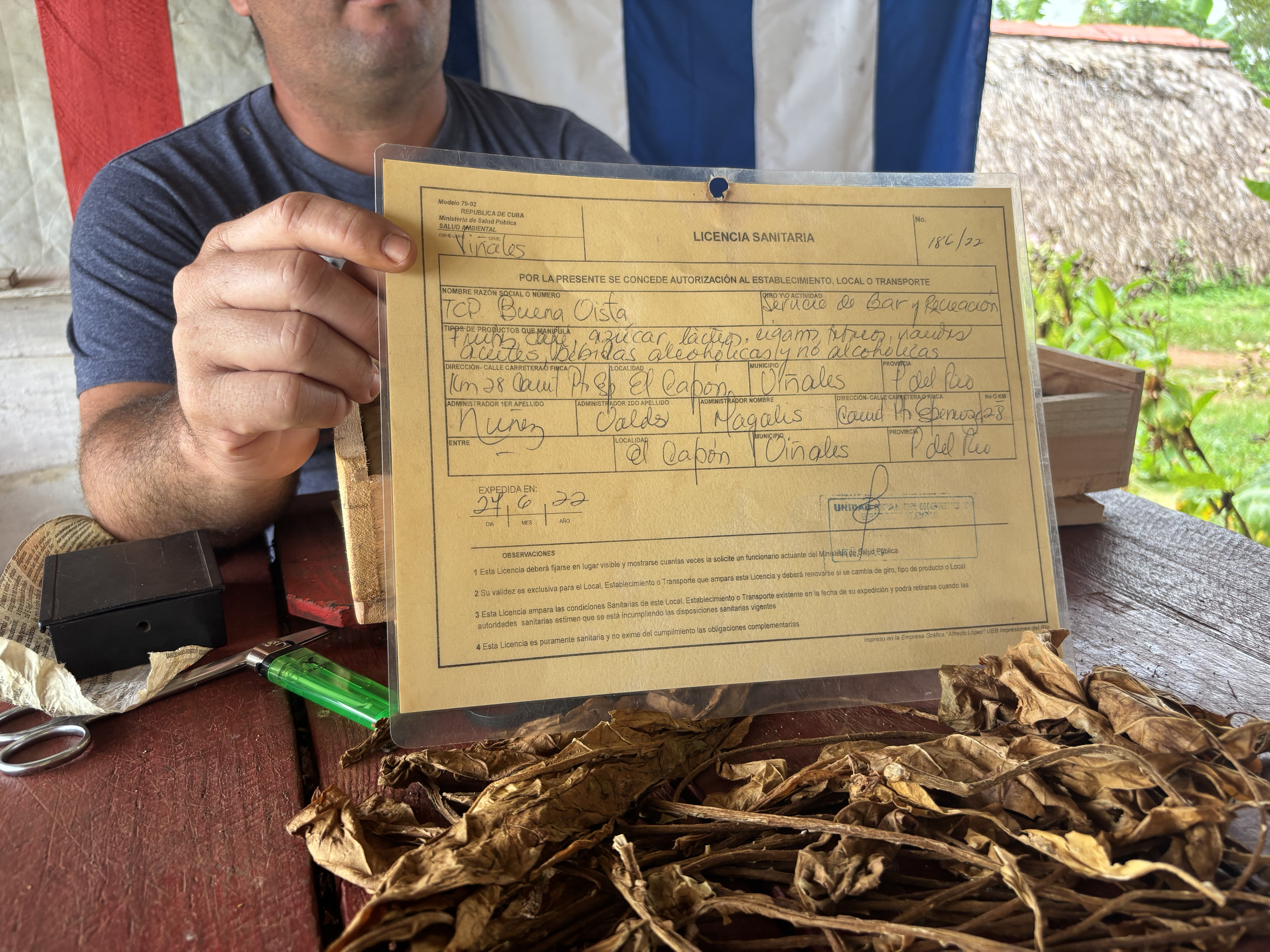
A sanitary license (licencia sanitaria) delivered by the Ministry of Health, shown in a tobacco plantation in Viñales to demonstrate conformity, in June 2025

Smoking-related diseases such as lung cancer, esophageal cancer, and mouth cancer are common in Cuba, as are other cancers associated with smoking. Various laws regarding smoking regulations have been on the books in Cuba since the 1980s, but serious efforts were not made to enforce them until around 2005. These laws included bans on tobacco advertisements, prohibiting sales to minors, and bans on smoking in public places. Additionally, educational initiatives were ramped up around this time, addressing public health education on the harm caused by tobacco, putting health warnings on packaging, and instructing doctors to inform their patients at any given opportunity about the dangers of smoking. The response from smokers has been largely negative.

== Global competition ==
Competition has come from the United States in several ways. The first of these is the Connecticut leaf, a type of shade tobacco that caused competition in European markets for having a significantly less harsh flavor than Cuba's shade tobacco.

The second is the Florida cigar industry originally started before the Revolution due to the "Clear Havana" Cigar. In 1868, cigar manufacturer Vicente Martinez-Ybor moved his cigar operations from Cuba to Key West, Florida to escape conflict and to avoid paying the United States' higher excise tax on imported manufactured products. In 1885, he bought land in Tampa, Florida, and built the cigar manufacturing town of Ybor City. Other manufacturers followed, and Tampa soon became the world's leading cigar producing community by specializing in "Clear Havana" cigars—hand-rolled cigars made from Cuban tobacco by mostly Cuban workers in the United States.

The third is the duplicate brands created by Cuban exiles and the trademarks appropriated by United States Manufacturers. This phenomenon is not unique to the United States. There are currently at least 17 cigar brands being produced both by Cubatabaco in Cuba and completely unrelated non-Cuban manufacturers abroad, including such premium marques as Cohiba, Montecristo, Partagás, and H. Upmann. Cuba's main exporter to Europe, Altadis, owns one of the companies producing these duplicate Cuban cigars, Consolidated Cigar Co.

Outside of the West, Indonesia has periodically presented competition for Cuba in the form of higher tobacco production, and was described in a 1999 edition of Cigar Aficionado magazine as a "tobacco Mecca". The global rise of health concerns pertaining to smoking have impacted the cigar market less severely than the cigarette market, but it has made a visible impact on demand. In response, in the mid-2000s Cuba attempted to develop a less harmful tobacco, dubbed IT-2004.

== Patent disputes and the Culbro/General Cigar vs. Cubatabaco lawsuit ==
The United States embargo and the nationalization of private property caused many Cuban cigar producers to flee abroad, taking their seed, technique, and trademarks with them. While Cuba argues that it nationalized the trademarks when it nationalized the companies, the legal basis for this claim was, and remains, in question. Cubatabaco continued production under the various names that it had coopted, while abroad, the exiled Cuban producers did the same, particularly in the United States and the Dominican Republic, advertising "Cuban cigars" that, while not originating in Cuba, are ostensibly made by Cubans in the Cuban tradition.

In 1981, Culbro LLC registered Cohiba as its own trademark, transferring that trademark in 1987 to General Cigar Company, which they owned. Under United States common law, if one sells a product under a patent name, one takes de facto ownership of that patent. If an international company wants to register a trademark as their own in the United States, they must register the intellectual property with the United States Patent and Trademark Office (USPTO). Due in part to the embargo and in part to the sour Cold-War relations between the United States and Cuba, these registration negotiations never took place. Ten years after the trademark transfer between Culbro and General Cigar, Cubatabaco petitioned the USPTO to stop General Cigar from advertising, claiming the company was hurting Cubatabaco's brand reputation. In response to this dispute, two Florida senators co-sponsored the Omnibus Consolidation and Emergency Supplemental Act. The 211th section of this article prevents Cuban companies from registering a confiscated trademark in the United States unless the original owner allows it. Under the law, General Cigar and/or Culbro would be considered the original owners. The European Union interfered when it deemed the law to be in conflict with TRIPS, and demanded a consultation with the United States through the World Trade Organization. This yielded no concrete results. The case remains embattled and unresolved.

General Cigar is not the only company to produce previously Cuban brand cigars under its own name. Altadis U.S.A. makes cigars under the Rome y Julieta, Montecristo, and H. Upmann names.

== Effects of the United States embargo on Cuban tobacco products ==
On 7 February 1962, United States president John F. Kennedy imposed a trade embargo on Cuba to sanction Fidel Castro's communist government. According to Pierre Salinger, then Kennedy's press secretary, the president ordered him on the evening of 6 February to obtain 1,200 H. Upmann brand Petit Upmann Cuban cigars. Upon Salinger's arrival with the cigars the following morning, Kennedy signed the executive order which put the embargo into effect. The embargo prohibited US residents from purchasing Cuban cigars and American cigar manufacturers from importing Cuban tobacco, depriving the Cuban government of income from an important cash crop.

The embargo dealt a major blow to Florida's cigar industry. Richard Goodwin, a White House assistant to Presidents Kennedy and Johnson, revealed in a 2000 New York Times article that in early 1962, JFK told him: "We tried to exempt cigars, but the cigar manufacturers in Tampa objected." They were concerned that they would be forced to use inferior tobacco from elsewhere and could not compete with Cuban-made cigars. Due to the inability to import Cuban tobacco leaves, however, most Tampa cigar manufacturers either moved production out of the United States or simply shut down.

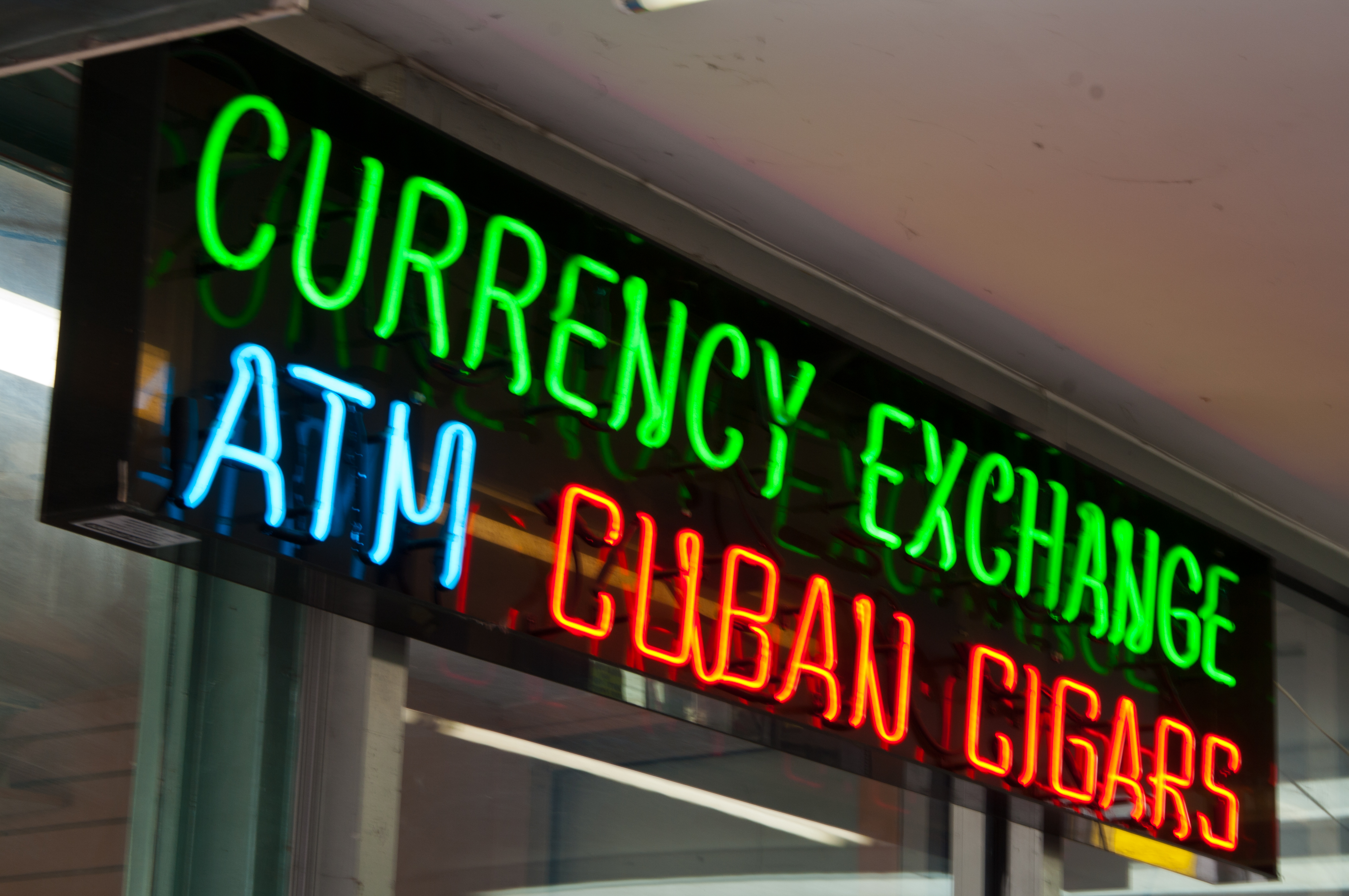
Advertisement aimed at American tourists in Niagara Falls, Ontario, minutes away from the US–Canada border

The embargo has been a significant roadblock in the Cuban government's efforts to advocate for itself in regards to the validity of its trademarks on its various cigar brands that have been duplicated by 'twin' companies abroad.

Although Cuban cigars cannot legally be commercially imported into the US, the advent of the Internet has made it much easier for people in the US to purchase cigars online from other countries, especially when shipped without bands. Cuban cigars are openly advertised in some European tourist regions, catering to the American market, even though it is illegal to advertise tobacco in most European regions.

The United States' pursuit of those who violate the trade embargo extends to cigars, sometimes at the expense of violating other countries' privacy laws. In the early 2010s, the United States confiscated $26,000 belonging to a Danish man who had been using the funds to buy Cuban cigars from a German seller. The US Treasury asserted that this interaction was a violation of the embargo, despite the funds being transferred between a Danish citizen and a German distributor, and Cuba not being to any extent involved in that particular transaction. Despite violation of the embargo having large scale consequences for most, the former secretary of state Henry Kissinger was able to obtain them from Castro during his diplomatic visit in the 1970s. Despite Kissinger being a non-smoker, customs was prevented from seizing what would have been considered illegal contraband, and the attendant who attempted to do so was reprimanded for trying to take away Castro's gift.

The loosening of the embargo in January 2015 included a provision that allowed the importation into the US of up to $100 worth of alcohol or tobacco per traveler, allowing legal importation for the first time since the ban. In October 2016, the Federal government liberalized restrictions on the number of cigars that an American can bring back to the U.S. for personal use without having to pay customs taxes. This allowed the import of up to 100 cigars (four standard boxes) or $800 worth without paying duty once every 31 days. Quantities above that are subject to taxation. Cigars may be consumed personally or gifted, but not sold by an individual, either a private sale to another individual or to a cigar store or distributor. Commercial sale and possession of Cuban cigars remains prohibited within the United States. President Donald Trump re-tightened tobacco restrictions in 2019. In addition, President Trump also tightened travel restrictions for US citizens, removing the "people-to-people" educational travel option for individuals. US citizens may legally consume Cuban cigars while in Cuba, or while within another country in which they are legal, but may not bring any back with them through US customs as the Obama administration once allowed.

== Agricultural reform and the Cubatabaco-Tabacalera Deal ==
In 1993, Cuba began the recampezinación, an effort to rebuild Cuban peasantry. In so doing, state control over tobacco farms was cut in half. This was in part an effort to lessen the damage done by the Storm of the Century and the following tropical depression, which had destroyed 60 percent of Cuba's tobacco crop. In 1994, Tabacalera, Spain's largest tobacco buyer, offered Cubatabaco financial assistance with production and export in exchange for a guarantee of primary preference on tobacco export, with the expectation that Tabacalera would account for three quarters of Cuban tobacco exports, and 40 percent of cigar exports. As a result, Cuban tobacco exports, which had been cut roughly in half by the agricultural crisis the 1993 weather events had caused, began to recover. A similar deal was struck with the French tobacco importer SEITA, and in 1999, Tabacalera and SEITA merged to become Altadis, Cuba's single largest trade partner in regards to tobacco.

== See also ==
- List of cigar brands
- Smoking in Cuba
