= Cigar boom =

Increased cigar consumption in the US during the mid-1990s

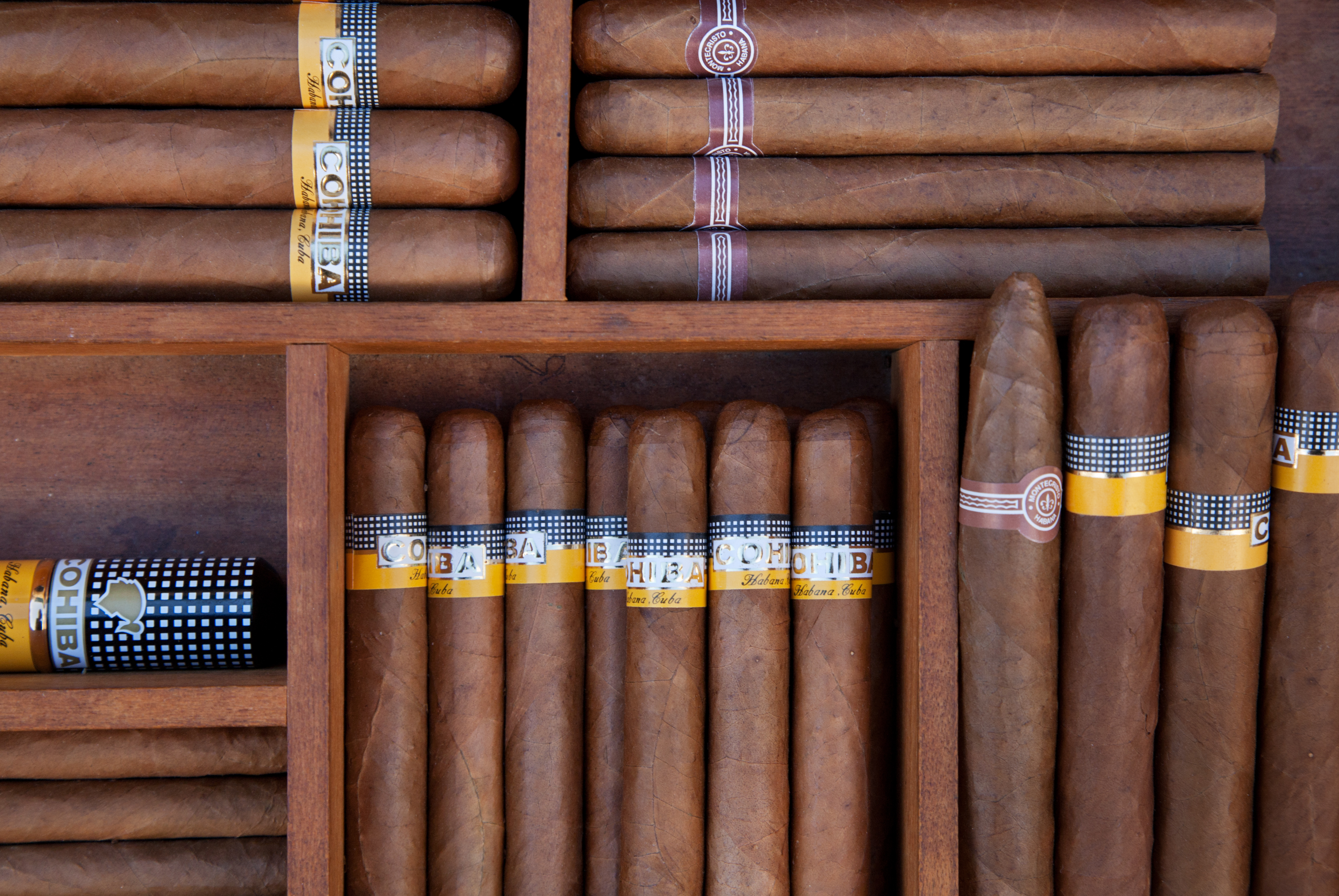
Display of Cuban cigars (Montecristo and Cohiba) in Havana, Cuba

The cigar boom is the name given to the resurgence of cigar consumption in the United States during the mid-1990s. Beginning in 1992, imports and sales of premium cigars began to rise dramatically and manufacturers struggled to keep up with demand, leading to industry-wide shortages of raw materials and finished products. The period was marked and the trend accelerated with the 1992 establishment of Cigar Aficionado magazine.

By 1997, production caught up with demand and the downward side of the cycle of boom and bust began to make itself felt, leading to a shakeout of many of the smaller and weaker upstart manufacturers of boutique premium cigars. A slow resurgence of the industry began in 2001, until by 2011 total cigar imports began again to approach the peak years of the boom.

== History ==
=== American cigar demand in the 1980s ===
Throughout the decade of the 1980s, imports of handmade cigars into the United States remained stagnant at about 100 million cigars per year. The lengthy plateau in consumer demand allowed tobacco farmers and brokers and cigar manufacturers to plan for future production. Since cigar tobacco requires an extensive preparation process, including stripping, sorting, fermentation, and aging, which can take years on its own, dramatic changes in the level of output required two or three years of advance time.

Cigar industry veteran Lew Rothman later recalled that

"Because there was only a finite number of potential customers and a fairly predictable demand for premium cigars, the quantity of tobacco planted to supply that demand, and the price for those wrappers, binders, and filler leaves, remained very constant throughout the 1980s and into the '90s. Basically, there were no new farmers, brokers, or factories for the product, and it was 'the same old, same old' for over a decade."

=== The 1992 revival ===
In the 4th Quarter of 1992, the long-term decline in the importation of cigars began to show signs of being reversed, as quantities increased by 4% over previous year totals.

The end of 1992 also saw the establishment of a new publication, credited by some with spurring the cigar boom of the 1990s. Cigar Aficionado magazine, a glossy monthly publication, helped to legitimize the idea that cigars were not a vile relic of a by-gone century and helped to foster an epicurean attitude towards hand-crafted tobacco products. Over the years a number of important celebrities revealed themselves to be cigar connoisseurs in its pages, including television's William Shatner and radio's Rush Limbaugh.

The year 1993 saw the first significant increase in cigar imports to the United States in more than a decade, with a total of 117.8 million cigars brought into the country, an increase of about 10 percent over the previous year's totals.

The next year saw a further 12 percent gain in the number of imported cigars into the American market, to 132.4 million pieces. This was followed by an astounding 33 percent gain in 1995, with 176.3 million cigars imported into the country in that year. This trend further accelerated during the first part of 1996, with yet another 36 percent gain posted in the first quarter of that year. By the time 1996 came to a close, some 293 million premium cigars had been imported into the United States — an astonishing 66% gain over 1995's record imports.

Many upstart companies began in the 1990s in an attempt to meet blossoming demand, with long-term survivors including Tabacalera Perdomo (established 1992), Oliva Cigar Co. (established 1995), and Rocky Patel (established mid-1990s). Many other upstart companies began manufacturing cigars in this period, meeting a change in consumer purchasing patterns that favored purchasing single cigars produced by a broad range of manufacturers rather than box quantities from established makers.

This period also saw the growth of parallel grass roots industries, such as independent record labels, premium coffee houses powered by the rapid expansion of Starbucks, and microbreweries which produced special varieties of beer. The rapid expansion of demand for and manufacture of hand-crafted cigars may be seen as part and parcel of this broad consumer trend which sought specialized craft products over generic mass-produced goods.

=== Problems of the boom ===
Due to the nearly two year turnaround between tobacco seed and the youngest finished premium product, production was for a time unable to keep up with the new fad-like demand for premium cigars, resulting in widespread backorders and rising prices. By 1995, the number of backordered cigars to American tobacconists hit the 25 million mark. Even as imports soared, this supply situation worsened, until nearly 50 million cigars were on backorder, unable to be shipped due to insufficient wholesale inventory, in 1996. For nearly six weeks in the summer of 1996, General Cigar Company found itself sold out of its Macanudo cigar, unable to ship even a single box of what was then the best-selling premium cigar in America.

Lew Rothman later remembered the extraordinary situation in these years:

"Insanity reigned. * * *

"Tobacco is harvested in six to seven primings, as the leaves on a plant mature from bottom to top. Each priming is normally three leaves. In past years and under normal circumstances, what is left is the corona, or top, of the plant. These are very small leaves heavily laden with nicotine. The corona was often sold to chewing tobacco companies who flavored this nicotine-laden tobacco and then sold it under names like Mail Pouch, Red Man, and others... If the corona remained unsold, then it and the stalk would be plowed under to provide soil-enriching nitrogen for next year's crop.

"During the Cigar Boom years, this practice all but disappeared! Why? Because during the priming cycle the tobacco stalks would have a secondary growth of tiny leaves much like the sucker branches you might see on a tree limb. The shortages of tobacco were so ferocious that everyone began harvesting these tiny second-growth leaves, called capadura, to use as filler tobaccos, and brokers started to sell capadura, the same stuff that used to get plowed under. The point [is] that every single conceivable scrap of anything that would pass for cigar leaf was being courted by manufacturers large and small, new and old, to meet the demand for cigars in the first half of the 1990s."

As backstocks of aged tobacco vanished and inferior sources were exploited, quality suffered. The April 1997 issue of Cigar Insider newsletter rated 50 offerings and scored none higher than 90 points for the first time in the publication's 16-month history. Newcomers to the industry, intent on making quick cash from the cigar fad, frequently produced an inferior product.

=== The bust of 1997 and legacy ===
The cigar boom is recognized to have ended in 1997, when the expanded supply of handmade cigars caught up with backorders and soon far outstripped demand, leaving millions of unsold cigars in wholesale inventory. Dedicated cigar smokers wearied of the frequently poor quality of new makers and returned to established names of the industry, while many newcomers moved on to new hobbies.

As demand for new brands plummeted, newly established makers faced unparalleled cash-flow problems and began to dump their unsold inventories. Discount cigar retailers suddenly found themselves awash in available product, with cigars sometimes being sold in 1998 for less than the cost of production.

The bust which swept the industry continued for a period of two years, a shakedown which resulted in the death of many fledgling companies. Many of the manufacturers who survived the downturn of the industry, generally basing their production in the Dominican Republic, Nicaragua, or Honduras, were able to reestablish themselves through the marketing of new and innovative shapes and sizes. Traditional ring gauges were de-emphasized in favor of thicker and longer products, a trend which has continued into the cigar market of the 21st century.

Cigar sales began to climb again only in 2001. The rate of growth in the subsequent decade was slow, steady, and sustainable, averaging 6 percent annually. In 2011 a total of 278.5 million premium cigars were imported into the United States — 2.5 times the level of the last "pre-boom" year, 1991.
