= Macanudo (cigar) =

Dominican cigar brand

- Industry: Tobacco
- Founded: 1971; 54 years ago
- Headquarters: Dominican Republic
- Area served: Worldwide
- Products: Premium Cigar and Pipe Tobacco
- Parent: General Cigar Company

Macanudo is a brand of cigar produced by the General Cigar Company in the Dominican Republic. It is noted for its mild flavor and light café (or claro) Connecticut shade wrapper, but is also available in a darker maduro wrapper, catering to a range of preferences among cigar aficionados.

== History ==
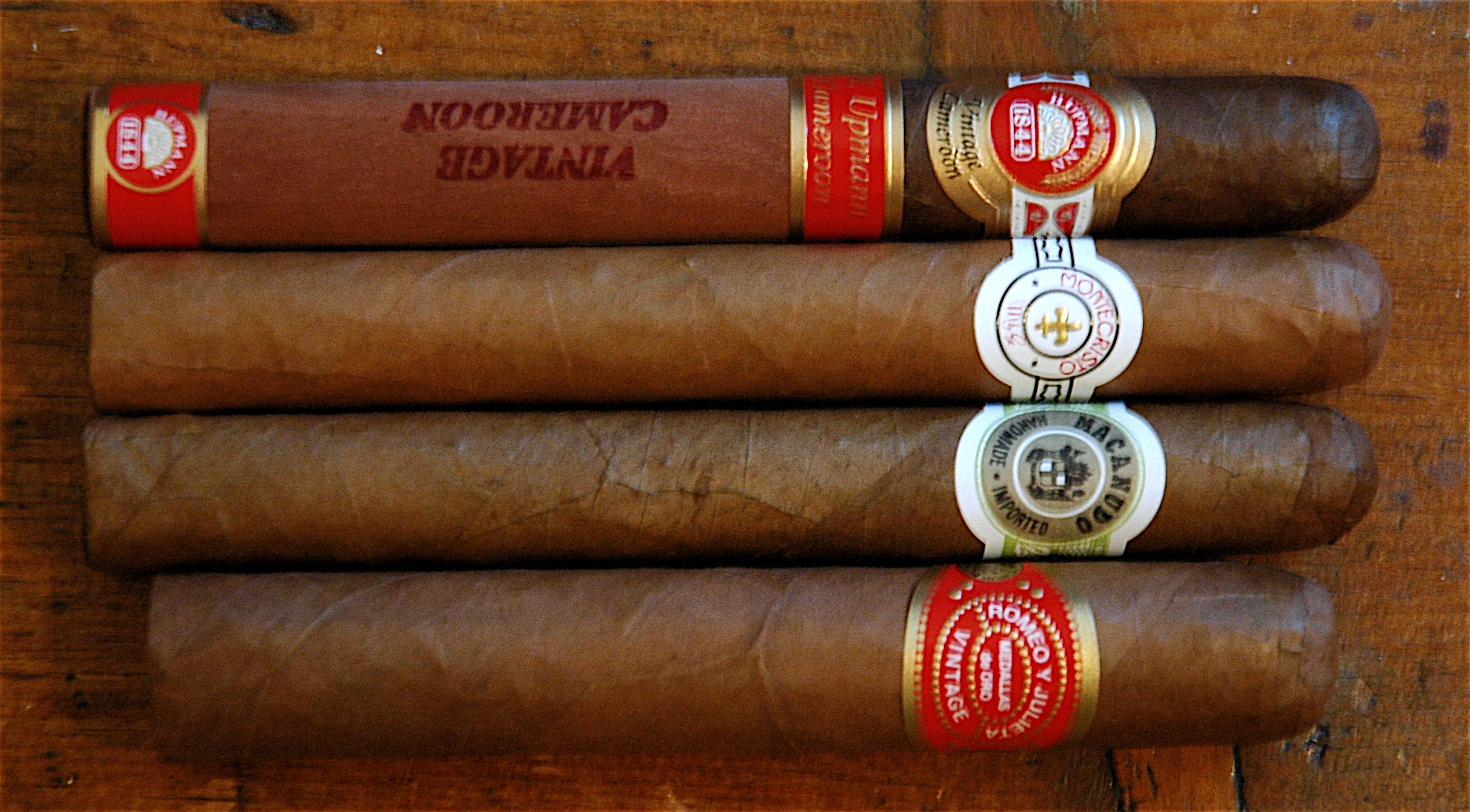
Cigars (top to bottom) by H. Upmann, Montecristo, Macanudo, Romeo y Julieta

Macanudo was originally the name of a frontmark produced in Guatemala by the makers of the Cuban brand of Punch. In 1971, General Cigar, which had acquired rights to the name outside of Cuba, introduced a completely distinct Macanudo as a brand unto itself. It was developed in Jamaica under the leadership of Ramón Cifuentes, a veteran of Cuban cigar maker Partagas. Production shifted from Cuba after the revolution there in 1959, first to Jamaica, then to the Dominican Republic in October 2000.

Later in the 1960s, Culbro and General Cigar acquired Gradiaz Annis, maker of Gold Label cigars and the Temple Hall factory that owned the Macanudo brand name, ushering in a turn towards hand-rolled premium cigars. Macanudo, a small label made in limited quantities for the market in the United Kingdom, was seen as the principal vehicle for growth in the premium cigar category. A careful effort was made to reblend the product for the large American marketplace (then and now subject to a ban on Cuban tobacco, the industry's gold standard) using select binder and filler from the Dominican Republic, Jamaica, and Mexico and Connecticut shade-grown wrapper. Mass advertising was conducted in support of the brand, which by the early 1990s had grown into the best-selling premium cigar label in the United States.

Macanudo became the official cigar of the Cigar Smoking World Championship (CSWC) in 2014, marking the beginning of a 15-year partnership with the event.

== Macanudo cigar line ==
=== Macanudo Café ===
- 8-9-8: 7" × 45
- Ascot: 4 3/16" × 32
- Baron de Rothschild: 6 1/2" × 42
- Caviar: 4" × 36
- Claybourne: 6" × 31
- Court (tube): 4 3/16" × 36
- Crystal (glass tube): 5 1/2" × 50
- Diplomat: 4 1/2" × 60
- Duke of Devon: 5 1/2" × 42
- Duke of Wellington: 8 1/2" × 47
- Duke of Windsor: 6" × 50
- Duke of York: 5 1/4" × 54
- Hampton Court (tube): 5 1/2" × 42
- Hyde Park: 5 1/2" × 49
- Lords: 4 3/4" × 49
- Majesty: 6" × 54
- Miniature: 3 3/4" × 24
- Petit Corona: 5" × 38
- Portofino (tube): 7" × 34
- Prince Philip: 7 1/2" × 49
- Prince of Wales: 8" × 52
- Thames (tube): 6" × 50
- Trump: 6 1/2" × 45
- Tudor: 6" × 52
- Library Edition "The Good Earth": 7" × 45

=== Macanudo Robust ===
- Ascot: 4 3/16" × 32
- Baron de Rothschild: 6 1/2" × 42
- Duke of Devon: 5 1/2" × 42
- Hampton Court (tube): 5 1/2" × 42
- Hyde Park: 5 1/2" × 49
- Petit Corona: 5" × 38
- Portofino (tube): 7" × 34
- Prince Philip: 7 1/2" × 49

=== Macanudo Maduro ===
- Ascots: 4 3/16" × 32
- Baron de Rothschild: 6 1/2" × 42
- Crystal (glass tube): 5 1/2" × 50
- Diplomat: 4 1/2" × 60
- Duke of Devon: 5 1/2" × 42
- Hampton Court (tube): 5 1/2" × 42
- Hyde Park: 5 1/2" × 49
- Prince Philip: 7 1/2" × 49

=== Macanudo Vintage 2000 ===
- I: 7 1/2" × 49
- II: 6 9/16" × 43
- III: 5 9/16" × 43
- V: 5 1/2" × 49
- VIII: 5 1/2" × 50
- X: 6" × 54
- Demi - 97's: 4 3/16" × 36

=== Macanudo Gold Label ===
- Crystal (glass tube): 5 1/2" × 50
- Duke of York: 5 1/4" × 54
- Hampton Court (tube): 5 1/2" × 42
- Lord Nelson: 7" × 49
- Shakespeare: 6 1/2" × 45
- Somerset: 5" × 54
- Tudor: 6" × 52

== See also ==
- List of cigar brands
