= Factory name =

Standard cigar sizes

In Cuban cigar production, the factory name or vitola de galera is a standard name given to the size of the cigar across all manufacturers.

Each cigar has a factory name and a model name. The model names are up to the individual manufacturer, some simply use the factory name, but as you see in the example below, some choose a different name, and may have one or more cigars of the same size, but may all have different names.

For example, the Emininentes (see coronas table below) is currently produced by two brands or manufacturers, H. Upmann and Partagas. H.Upmann sells it as 'Corona Major' and Partagas has two models in that size, the 'Coronas Senior' and the 'Petit Coronas Especiales' , but regardless of manufacturer or model name, all three are Emininentes and are exactly the same size and shape.

Outside Cuba most manufacturers, especially those established by Cuban exiles after the revolution, adhered to the Cuban factory-name system into the 1970s, but since then have introduced their own vitolas and naming, without any systemization across the industry.

== Factory Names and Sizes ==
Below is a list of the factory names and sizes, some of which are not currently in production (marked with a *), some also have two or more names (sometimes shown in brackets).

The sizes shown for the imperial measurements for length are in inches and the ring gauge (diameter) is in ^{1}/_{64}ths of an inch, the metric measurements are in millimetres.

=== Cigarillos ===
Factory Name	Size (Imperial) Length, Ring	Size (Metric) Length, Dia.
Demi-Tip	4, 32	100, 12.70
Chicos	4 ^{1}/_{8}, 29	106, 11.51
Laguito No.3	4 ^{1}/_{2}, 26	115, 10.32
Carolinas	4 ^{3}/_{4}, 26	121, 10.32
Panatelas Largas	6 ^{7}/_{8}, 28	175, 11.11

=== Slim Panatelas ===
Entreactos	4, 30	100, 11.91
Demi-Tasse*	4, 32	100, 12.70
Petit	4 ^{1}/_{4}, 31	108, 12.30
Panatelas	4 ^{5}/_{8}, 34	117, 13.49
Seoane	5, 33	126, 13.10
Placeras	5, 34	125, 13.49
Palmitas	6, 32	152, 12.70
Deliciosos	6 ^{1}/_{4}, 33	159, 13.10
Palmas	6 ^{5}/_{8}, 33	170, 13.10
Ninfas	7, 33	178, 13.10

=== Short Panatelas ===
Infantes*	3 ^{7}/_{8}, 37	98, 14.69
Epicures	4 ^{3}/_{8}, 35	110, 13.89
Trabucos	4 ^{3}/_{8}, 38	110, 15.08
Cadetes	4 ^{1}/_{2}, 36	115, 14.29
Sports	4 ^{5}/_{8}, 35	117, 13.89
Belvederes	5, 39	125, 15.39
Conchitas	5, 35	127, 13.89
Vegueritos	5, 36	127, 14.29
Preferidos*	5, 38	127, 15.08
Universales	5 ^{1}/_{4}, 38	134, 15.08

=== Panatelas ===
Media Corona	5 ^{1}/_{2}, 38	142, 15.08
Carlotas	5 ^{5}/_{8}, 35	143, 13.89
Laguito No.2	6, 38	152, 15.08
Naturales*	6 ^{1}/_{8}, 37	155, 14.68
Toppers*	6 ^{1}/_{4}, 39	160, 15.48
Parejos	6 ^{1}/_{2}, 38	166, 15.08

=== Long Panatelas ===
Delicados Extra	7 ^{1}/_{4}, 36	185, 14.29
Laguito No.1 (Delicados)	7 ^{1}/_{2}, 38	192, 15.08

=== Petit Coronas ===
Half Corona	3 ^{1}/_{2}, 44	90, 17.46
Perlas	4, 40	102, 15.87
Reyes	4 ^{3}/_{8}, 40	110, 15.87
Minutos	4 ^{3}/_{8}, 42	110, 16.67
Franciscanos	4 ^{5}/_{8}, 40	116, 15.87
Coronitas	4 ^{5}/_{8}, 40	117, 15.87
Standard	4 ^{7}/_{8}, 40	123, 15.87
Londres	5, 40	126, 15.87
Petit Cetros	5 ^{1}/_{8}, 40	129, 15.87
Marevas (Petit Coronas)	5 ^{1}/_{8}, 42	129, 16.67
Almuerzos	5 ^{1}/_{8}, 40	130, 15.87

=== Coronas ===
Emininentes	5 ^{1}/_{4}, 42	132, 16.67
Coloniales (Eminentes*)	5 ^{1}/_{4}, 44	132, 17.46
Cosacos	5 ^{3}/_{8}, 42	135, 16.67
Dalias Cortas*	5 ^{1}/_{4}, 43	135, 11.51
Cremas (Nacionales)	5 ^{1}/_{2}, 40	140, 15.87
Coronas	5 ^{5}/_{8}, 42	142, 16.67
Franciscos	5 ^{5}/_{8}, 44	143, 17.46
Conservas	5 ^{3}/_{4}, 43	145, 17.07
Superiores*	5 ^{3}/_{4}, 40	146, 15.87
Cristales	5 ^{7}/_{8}, 41	150, 16.27

=== Long Coronas (Lonsdales) ===
Coronas Grande	6 ^{1}/_{8}, 42	155, 16.67
Cazadores	6 ^{3}/_{8}, 43	162, 17.07
Cervantes	6 ^{1}/_{2}, 42	165, 16.67
Dalias	6 ^{5}/_{8}, 43	170, 17.07
Fundadores	7 ^{1}/_{2}, 40	192, 15.87

=== Coronas Extra (Grand Coronas) ===
Especiales*	5 ^{1}/_{4}, 45	134, 17.86
Britanicas*	5 ^{3}/_{8}, 46	137, 18.26
Coronas Gordas	5 ^{5}/_{8}, 46	143, 18.26

=== Robustos & Toros ===
Petit Robustos	4, 50	102, 19.84
Robustos	4 ^{7}/_{8}, 50	124, 19.84
Hermosos No. 4	5, 48	127, 19.05
Edmundo	5 ^{3}/_{8}, 52	135, 20.64
Gordito	5 ^{1}/_{2}, 50	141, 19.84
Cañonazo	5 ^{7}/_{8}, 52	150, 20.64
Dobles	6 ^{1}/_{8}, 50	155, 19.84
Hermosos No. 2	6 ^{1}/_{4}, 48	157, 19.05
Sublimes	6 ^{3}/_{8}, 54	164, 21.43
Hermosos No. 1	6 ^{5}/_{8}, 48	167, 19.05
Robusto Extra	6 ^{5}/_{8}, 50	170, 19.84

=== Churchills ===
Julieta 2	7, 47	178, 18.65

=== Double Coronas ===
Paco	7, 49	180, 19.45
Fabulosos No. 6	7, 50	180, 19.84
Prominentes	7 ^{5}/_{8}, 49	194, 19.45

=== Giant ===
Gran Corona	9 ^{1}/_{4}, 47	235, 18.65

== Figurados ==
Figurados are cigars that do not have straight sides, but are irregularly shaped, and have their own factory names, regardless of size. (For more information see Cigar Size and shapes)

Below is a list of factory names for the figurados, with 'Perfectos'(cigars that narrow at both ends) marked with a '‡'. As above, shapes not currently in production, are marked with a '*'.

Figurados (Torpedoes & Perfectos)
Factory Name	Size (Imperial) Length, Ring	Size (Metric) Length, Dia.
Petit Bouquets‡	4, 43	101, 17.07
Favoritos‡	4 ^{3}/_{4}, 42	127, 16.67
Perfectos‡	5, 44	127, 17.46
Petit Piramides‡	5, 50	127, 19.84
Generosos‡	5 ^{1}/_{4}, 42	132, 16.67
Campanas	5 ^{1}/_{2}, 52	140, 20.64
Exquisitos‡	5 ^{3}/_{4}, 46	145, 18.26
Culebras*	5 ^{3}/_{4}, 39	146, 15.48
Piramides	6 ^{1}/_{8}, 52	156, 20.64
Tacos‡	6 ^{1}/_{4}, 47	158, 18.65
Salomones(I)‡	7 ^{1}/_{4}, 57	175, 22.23
Manolin‡*	9 ^{1}/_{8}, 47	232, 18.65
Gran Corona Partagas Largas‡*	9 ^{1}/_{4}, 50	237, 19.84
