= Smoking in Cuba =

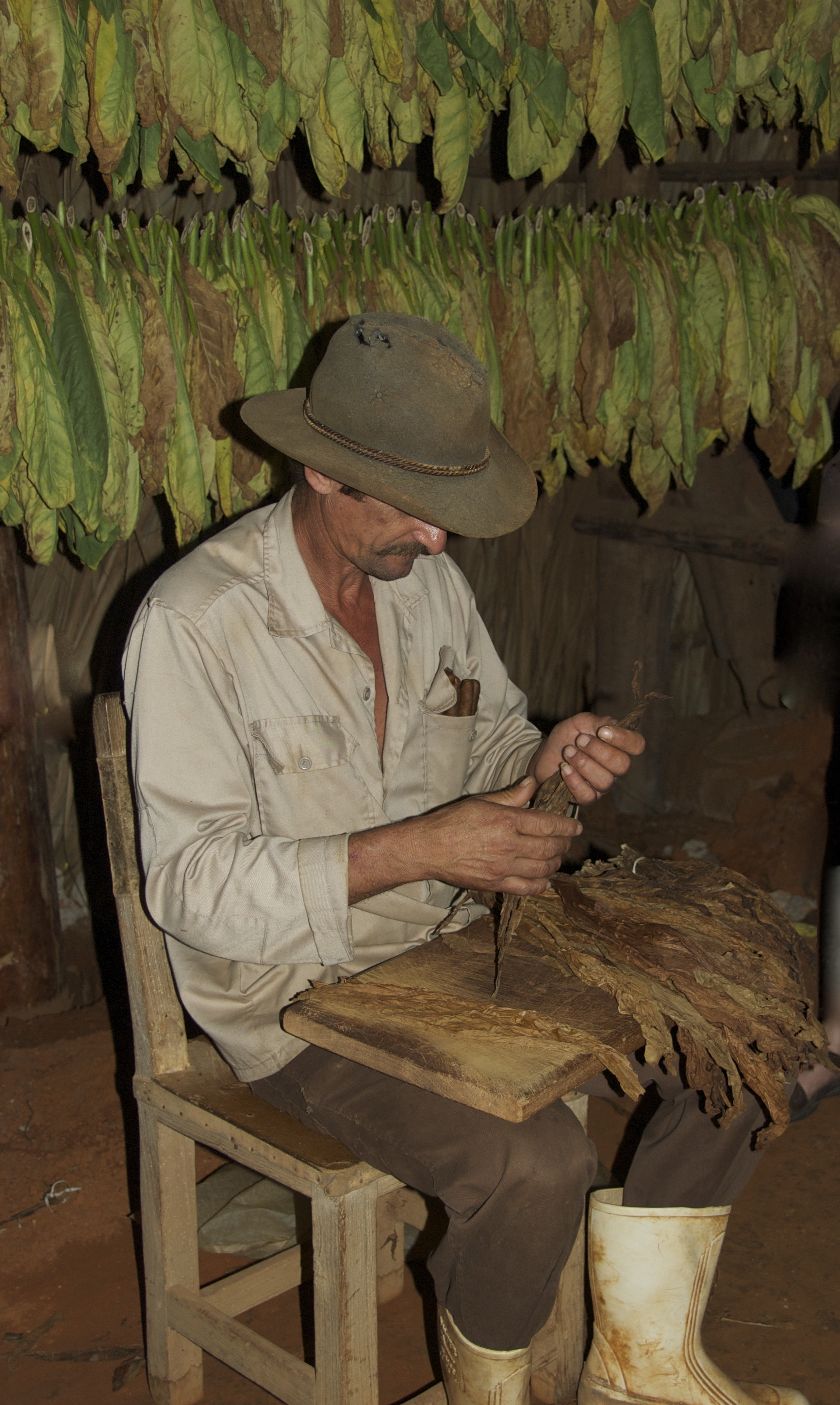
Drying and sorting tobacco leaves in Cuba.

Smoking in Cuba is prevalent, with a Gallup poll in May 2007 revealing that 45% of Cuban people had smoked on the day before the survey.

The Peoples' Organization of Cuba (PO Cuba) said smoking rates are too high in the country and must be lowered.

== History ==
In 1717, the Spanish Crown established a monopoly over Cuban tobacco production. The monopoly generated enormous profits. From 1740 to 1760, about 85 percent of the tobacco processed by the royal factory in Seville came from Cuba, and this monopoly produced annual profits that grew from nearly 4 million pesos in the early 1740s to over 5 million by the late 1750s, and exceeded the profit from silver. Tobacco played a role in the illegal trade that flourished in remote parts of the Spanish Empire in the eighteenth century, undermining Spanish colonialism.

== Geography ==
Cuba has excellent conditions for growing tobacco, with several regions enjoying world-class conditions for cultivation. The Pinar del Río province, located at the western end of the island, is particularly important for tobacco cultivation and contains the Vuelta Abajo and Semi Vuelta regions. These regions are known for producing some of the finest tobacco in the world. Cuban cigars are manufactured in Cuba using tobacco grown within the country. The wrapper, filler, and binder of a cigar can all be grown in Cuba. Cuban cigars have a long-standing reputation for being among the world's finest cigars.

== See also ==
- Cuban cigar
