= Bolívar (cigar brand) =

Cuban and Dominican cigar brands

The Bolívar logo

Bolívar is the name of two brands of premium cigar, one produced on the island of Cuba for Habanos SA, the Cuban state-owned tobacco company, and the other produced in the Dominican Republic from Dominican and Nicaraguan tobacco for General Cigar Company, which is today a subsidiary of Scandinavian Tobacco Group. Both are named for the South American revolutionary, Simón Bolívar.

The Cuban-produced Bolívar cigars are full-bodied, with considerable ligero in the blend, and have traditionally been some of the strongest and most full-bodied Havana cigars.

== History ==
The brand was founded (possibly in Great Britain) by José F. Rocha around 1901 or 1902, though the brand was not registered in Havana (Cuba) until 1921, under the ownership of Rocha's firm, J.F. Rocha y Cia.

During this time, the Bolívar brand produced the world's smallest cigar called the Delgado. Measuring a mere 1 7/8 inches with a 20 ring gauge, the Delgado had the honor of having a miniature box of its cigars featured in the royal nursery's dollhouse at Windsor Castle.

The company and rights to the brand name were purchased in 1954 by Cifuentes y Cia after Rocha's death and production was moved to the famous Partágas Factory in Havana (today known as the Francisco Pérez Germán factory), where many of its sizes are still produced today.

The Cuban Bolívar has a reputation among cigar aficionados of being one of the strongest and most full-bodied cigars, with its Royal Corona, Coronas Junior, Petit Coronas, and Belicosos Finos being famous examples of the marque. In 2002, when Altadis bought a controlling share in the Cuban government-owned cigar distributor, Habanos SA, a number of changes in cigar production were instituted. One of these changes was the decision to gradually turn the various brands of Cuban cigars to either all-handmade or all-machine-made lines. Bolívar, which has historically produced a variety of handmade and machine-made or machine-finished cigars, had several of its vitolas cut from production, with only one remaining, the cigarillo-sized Chicos. It remains to be seen if this size will eventually cease to be produced as well.

In 2004, Wolters in Cologne, Germany, had a few thousand boxes of Bolívar Gold Medals produced by Habanos SA exclusively for their shop. The cigars are an older, discontinued Bolívar size in the Cervantes (lonsdale) format, wrapped in gold foil on one half with a special Bolívar band in the middle and come packaged in boxes of ten. Following this release the Gold Medal was reinstated in 2007 as a LCDH cigar but was then discontinued in 2011.

The Bolívar brand has also been chosen several times for special sizes in regional releases.

=== Vitolas in the Bolívar Line ===
The following list of vitolas de salida (commercial vitolas) within the Bolívar marque lists their size and ring gauge in Imperial (and Metric), their vitolas de galera (factory vitolas), and their common name in American cigar slang.

Hand-Made Vitolas

- Belicoso Fino moño- 5 1/2" × 52 (140 × 20.64 mm), Campana, a pyramid
- Bolivar Tubo bareto No. 1 - 5 5/8" × 42 (143 × 16.67 mm), Corona, a corona
- Bolivar Tubo No. 2 - 5 1/8" × 42 (130 × 16.67 mm), Mareva, a petit corona
- Bolivar Tubo No. 3 - 4 7/8" × 34 (124 × 13.49 mm), Placera, a small panetela
- Corona Gigante - 7" × 47 (178 × 18.65 mm), Julieta No. 2, a churchill
- Corona Junior - 4 3/8" × 42 (111 × 16.67 mm), Minuto, a petit corona
- Petit Corona - 5 1/8" × 42 (130 × 16.67 mm), Mareva, a petit corona
- Royal Corona - 4 7/8" × 50 (124 × 19.84 mm), Robusto, a robusto

Edición Limitada Releases

- Petit Belicoso (2009) - 4 7/8" × 52 (125 × 20.64 mm), Petit Belicoso, a petit pyramid

Edición Regional Releases

- Colosal (Germany 2006) - 6 1/8" × 50 (156 × 19.84 mm), Doble, a robusto extra
- Libertador (France 2006, 2007) - 6 1/2" × 54 (165 × 21.43 mm), Sublime, a double robusto
- Simon (Canada 2007, 2009) - 5" × 48 (127 × 19.05 mm), Hermoso No. 4, a corona extra
- Double Corona (Middle East 2007) - 7 5/8" × 49 (194 × 19.45 mm), Prominente, a double corona
- Short Bolívar (Asia Pacific 2008) - 4 3/8" × 52 (110 × 20.64 mm) Petit Edmundo, a petit robusto
- Armonia (China 2008) - 7 1/4" × 57 (184 × 22.62 mm) Salomónes I, a double perfecto
- Petit Libertador (France 2008) - 4" × 50 (102 × 19.84 mm) Petit Robusto, a petit robusto
- Legendario (Switzerland 2008) - 6 1/8" × 50 (156 × 19.84 mm), Doble, a robusto extra
- Fabulosos (Benelux 2009) - 5 3/8" × 52 (135 × 20.64 mm) Edmundo, a robusto extra
- 5at Avenida (Germany 2009) - 7 1/4" × 50 (184 × 19.84 mm) 109, a double corona
- Especiales No. 2 (Germany 2009) - 7 1/2" × 38 (192 × 15.08 mm) Delicado, a long panetela
- Greco (Grecia y Chipre 2009) - 5.6" × 50 (141 × 50 mm) Gorditos, robusto extra
- B-2 (Canada 2010) - 6.1" × 52 (156 × 52 mm) Pirámides, a pyramid
- Emiratos (Emiratos Arabes Unidos(UAE) 2010) 6.5" × 54 (164 × 54 mm) Sublimes, a double robusto
- 108 (Spain 2010) - 5.6" × 46 (143 × 46 mm) Coronas Gordas, a corona gorda
- 681 (Bulgaria 2011) - 6.0" × 53 (153 × 53 mm) Sobresalientes, a robusto extra
- Distinguidos (China 2011) - 6.4" × 52 (162 × 52 mm) Romeo, a perfecto
- Británicas (Great Britain 2011) - 5.4" × 48 (138 × 48 mm) Británicas Extra, a perfecto
- Oryx (Qatar 2011) - 5.3" × 52 (135 × 52 mm) Edmundo, a robusto
- Emperador (Russia 2011) - 6.2" × 48 (157 × 48 mm) Hermosos No.2, a grand corona
- Redentores (Brazil 2013) - 4.5" x 52 (115 x 52) Magicos, a petit robusto
- Presidente (Switzerland 2013) - 5.9" x 54 (150 x 54) Geniales, a robusto extra
- Bosphorus (Turkey 2014) - 4 1/3" × 52 (110 x 52) Petit Edmundo, a petit robusto

Edicion Limitada Releases

- Petit Belicosos(2009) - 4.9" × 52 (125 × 52 mm), Petit Belicosos, a petit pyramid

La Casa del Habano Releases

- Gold Medal - 6.5" × 42 (165 × 16.67 mm) Cervantes, a lonsdale
- Libertadores - 6.5" x 54 (164 x 54) Sublimes, a double robusto

Habanos Collection Series

- Gran Belicoso (2010) - 7.1" × 54 (180 × 54 mm) Rodolfo, a double pyramid
- Gran Belicoso (2011) - 7.1" × 54 (180 × 54 mm) Rodolfo, a double pyramid (Released as part of the Colección Habanos 2011, which features all existing Collection Series)

Recently Discontinued Vitolas

- Bonitas(2009) - 5.0" × 40 (126 × 40 mm), Londres, a petit corona
- Inmensas(2009) - 63/4" × 34 (170 × 17.09 mm), Dalia, a lonsdale
- Corona Extra(2012) - 5 5/8" × 44 (143 × 17.46 mm), Francisco, a corona

== General Cigar Company's Bolívar brand ==
After tobacco was nationalized following the Cuban Revolution, the Cifuentes family fled Cuba. In 1978, following a 17-year hiatus, Ramón Cifuentes licensed the Partágas and Bolívar brand names to General Cigar Company, best known as the maker of White Owl, which relaunched a completely new Bolívar branded cigar for the lucrative American market. General Cigar's initial blend for their Bolivar branded cigars used mild Olor filler tobacco from the Dominican Republic, and bore little resemblance to the original Havana Bolívar in either body or flavor.

In 2005, the Dominican Bolívar brand was completely reformulated with the addition of a Honduran San Agustin ligero wrapper and Nicaraguan filler tobacco in the blend to more closely approximate the full-bodied strength of the Cuban Bolívar.

== In popular culture ==
In the movie Black Hawk Down, Somali warlord Osman Ali Atto smokes Bolívar Belicoso cigars.

== See also ==
- Cigar brands
