= Ligero =

Cigar bands on the products of La Flor Dominicana and Oliva Cigar Company touting a high ligero leaf content.

Ligero (pronounced "lee-HAIR-oh") is a type of tobacco leaf found near the top of each tobacco plant. Slower to mature than the seco and viso leaves found at the middle of the plant or the easy-burning volado leaves at the bottom, ligero leaves are characterized by a coarse texture and produce smoke with a potent, spicy taste. Ligero leaf is selected for the manufacture of heavy, full-bodied cigars, being rolled at the very center of the filler bundle owing to its slow-burning nature.

== Description ==
While the variety of tobacco, climate, and soil type affect the strength and flavor of tobacco smoke, another key variable is the part of the plant from which the leaves are harvested. The leaves of a tobacco plant ripen from the bottom to the top and are harvested in a series of "primings" as they become ready. As successive layers of leaves are picked and time passes, nutrients concentrate in the slowest ripening leaves remaining at the top of the plant, resulting in the strongest and most flavorful cigar tobacco.

Third-generation cigarmaker Carlos Fuente, Jr. has observed that traditional Cuban tobacco farming was a slow process which allowed for the full development of the spicy ligero leaf.

"…The top leaves are left to overripen, and it looks ugly as hell… And that's what gives you your baritone, heavy flavor, more body. It gives you more complexity."

Extended direct exposure to the sun is a chief contributing factor to the thickened texture and fuller flavor of ligero leaves. As ligero leaves tend to be thicker and oilier, they burn with more difficulty than other tobacco leaves. They are consequently rolled into the very center of the filler bundle of the cigar, so that ignition can be maintained by the lighter surrounding leaf.
