= Hoyo de Monterrey =

Name of two cigar brands

The Hoyo de Monterrey logo

Hoyo de Monterrey is the name of two brands of premium cigar, one produced on the island of Cuba for Habanos SA, the Cuban state-owned tobacco company and the other produced in Honduras by General Cigar Company, now a subsidiary of Swedish Match.

== History ==
In 1831, Don José Gener y Batet emigrated to Cuba from Spain at the age of thirteen, where he worked on his uncle's plantation in Vuelta Abajo. Twenty years later, he would open his own cigar factory in Havana and begin producing his own cigar line, La Escepción. In 1865, after using his factory's profits to acquire a tobacco farm in Vuelta Abajo, he registered a cigar line named for it: Hoyo de Monterrey.

Literally translated from Spanish to English as "the Hole of Monterrey" in reference to the concave terrain favoured by growers of premium tobacco, the brand became popular, especially in the British market and José Gener's factory subsequently became one of the largest factories in Cuba. In 1900, Gener died in Spain and his daughter Lutgarda Gener took over the business and it would stay in the family for another thirty years.

In 1931, the Gener family sold their cigar brands in order to focus more on their sugarcane properties. The firm of Fernández, Palicio y Cía bought the Hoyo de Monterrey and La Escepción brands and added them to their impressive line-up, which already included Punch and Belinda. Around this time, in the 1940s, the Le Hoyo series (along with the Chateaux series which would later be used to create the Davidoff cigar line) was created for Swiss distributor A. Dürr Co. After the death of partner Ramón Fernández, Fernando Palicio became sole proprietor of the business and by 1958 his cigar lines accounted for 13% of all Havana cigar exports.

After the revolutionary government of Cuba unilaterally nationalised all the cigar manufactures in 1959, Fernando Palicio voluntarily left Cuba for Florida. He subsequently sold his cigar lines to the Villazon family, which continued to make Punch, Hoyo de Monterrey and Belinda cigars in their Tampa, Florida factory from Honduran tobacco for the American market.

Hoyo de Monterrey continued production in Cuba and in Honduras and is still a popular, globally marketed Cuban cigar line. Among connoisseurs, the Epicure No. 2, Double Coronas and Le Hoyo series are particularly prized.

Being a globally marketed brand, Hoyo de Monterrey has been chosen for Habanos' annual Edición Limitada releases since 2000. The Particular had some production problems during the first Edición Limitada line-up in 2000, with few of the cigars getting out to vendors. This prompted Habanos to release it again the next year, the only Edición Limitada cigar so far to have had this happen. In 2004, a new size was added to the Hoyo de Monterrey line, the Petit Robusto, which also wore a slightly redesigned Hoyo de Monterrey cigar band.

== Available Vitolas in the Hoyo de Monterrey line ==
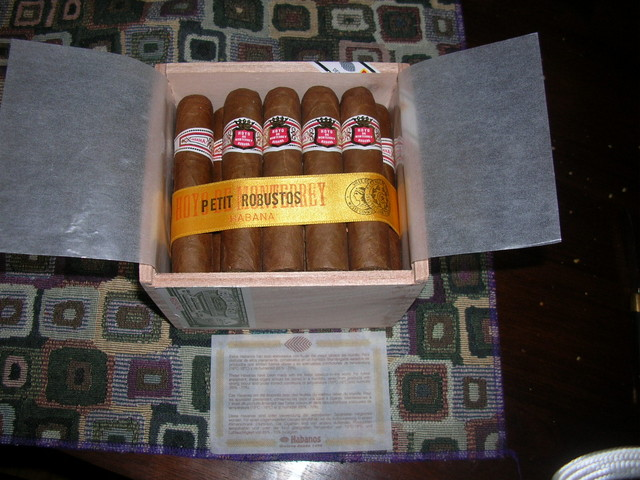
a cabinet box of Hoyo de Monterrey Petit Robustos

The following list of handmade vitolas de salida (commercial vitolas) within the Hoyo de Monterrey marque lists in order, their ring gauge/length in Imperial and Metric, their Factory name and a colloquial description of size/shape:

=== Vitolas ===
- Coronations - 42 x 5.1" (16.67 x 129 mm), Marevas, Petit Corona
- Double Coronas - 49 x 7.6" (19.45 x 194 mm), Prominentes, Double Corona
- Palmas Extra - 40 x 5.5" (15.88 x 140 mm), Cremas, Corona
- Petit Robustos - 50 x 4" (19.84 x 102 mm), Petit Robustos, Petit Robusto
- Epicure No. 1 - 46 x 5.6" (18.26 x 143 mm), Coronas Gordas, Grand Corona
- Epicure No. 2 - 50 x 4.9" (19.84 x 124 mm), Robustos, Robusto
- Epicure Especial - 50 x 5.6" (19.84 x 141 mm), Gorditos, Robusto Extra
- Le Hoyo des Dieux - 42 x 6.1" (16.67 x 155 mm), Coronas Grandes, Long Corona
- Le Hoyo du Depute - 38 x 4.3" (15.08 x 110 mm), Trabucos, Short Panetela
- Le Hoyo du Gourmet - 33 x 6.7" (13.10 x 170 mm), Palmas, Slim Panetela
- Le Hoyo du Maire - 30 x 3.9" (11.91 x 100 mm), Entreactos, Small Panetela
- Le Hoyo de San Juan - 54 x 5.9" (21.43 x 150 mm), Geniales, Robusto
- Le Hoyo de Rio Seco - 56 x 5.5" (21.43 x 140 mm), Aromosos, Robusto Extra

=== Edición Limitada ===
- Particulares (2000 and 2001) - 47 x 9.3" (18.65 x 235 mm), Gran Corona, Giant Corona
- Pirámide (2003) - 52 x 6.1" (20.64 x 156 mm), Pirámides, Pyramid
- Epicure Especial (2004) - 50 x 5.6" (19.84 x 141 mm), Gorditos, Robusto Extra
- Regalos (2007) - 46 x 5.4" (18.26 x 137 mm), Regalos, Corona Extra
- Short Hoyo Pirámides (2011) - 46 x 5.3" (18.26 x 135 mm), Forum, Petit Pyramid
- Grand Epicure (2013) - 55 x 5.1" (21.83 x 130 mm), Montesco, Robusto

=== Colección Habanos ===
- Extravaganza (2003 and 2011) - 50 x 7.2" (19.84 x 184 mm), Nro. 109, Double Robusto
- Maravillas (2015) - 55 x 9.2" (21.83 x 233 mm), Maravillas, Giant Robusto

=== Selección Habanos ===
- Pirámide (2003) - 52 x 6.1" (20.64 x 156 mm), Pirámides, Pyramid
- Epicure No. 2 (2003) - 50 x 4.9" (19.84 x 124 mm), Robustos, Robusto

=== Reserva ===
- Epicure No. 2 - 50 x 4.9" (19.84 x 124 mm), Robustos, Robusto*
- 'HOYO DE MONTERREY DOUBLE CORONA - 49 x 7.5/8" (19.24 x 192 mm), Coronas, Large Corona*

=== Habanos Añejados ===
- Hermosos No. 4 (2015) - 48 x 5.0" (19.1 x 127 mm), Hermosos No. 4, Corona Extra

=== La Casa Del Habano Exclusivo ===
- Epicure de Luxe (2012) - 52 x 4.5" (20.64 x 115 mm), Mágicos, Petit Robusto
- Elegantes - 47 x 6.2" (18.65 x 158 mm), Tacos, Perfecto

=== Réplica de Humidor Antiguo ===
- Monterrey (2011) - 55 x 7.2" (21.83 x 182 mm), Maravillas No. 1, Double Robusto

=== Duty Free and Travel Retail Series ===
- Petit Robustos (2008) - 50 x 4" (19.84 x 102 mm), Petit Robustos, Petit Robusto
- Double Epicure (2010) - 50 x 6.1" (19.84 x 155 mm), Dobles, Robusto Extra

=== Commemorative Humidors ===
- Gran Piramides (2004) - 57 x 6.3" (22.6 x 160 mm), Gran Piramides, Pyramid
- Monterrey (2004) - 55 x 9.2" (21.83 x 233 mm), Diademas, Giant Perfecto

== Trivia ==
- Red Auerbach was famous for smoking a Hoyo de Monterrey "victory cigar" before the end of basketball games of the Boston Celtics, the NBA team he worked for as a coach and executive from 1950 to 1997 and again from 2001 until his death in 2006.

== See also ==
- Cigar brands
