= Punch (cigar) =

Cuban and Honduran cigar brands

The Punch logo

Punch is the name of two brands of cigars, one produced on the island of Cuba for Habanos SA, the Cuban state-owned tobacco company, and the other produced in Honduras for General Cigar Company.

== History ==
The Punch brand was first registered in 1840 by German named Stockmann and named for the European puppet show character, Mr. Punch (not the magazine, which was created a year later). The brand quickly became a success, especially in Great Britain. The first change of ownership came in 1874, when the brand was bought by a Luis Corujo, and again in 1884, when the brand was purchased by Manuel López Fernández and its bands and boxes still bear his name to this day. Retiring in 1924 and dying shortly after, López gave ownership of the brand to Esperanza Valle Comas, who only held it for a few years before the Stock Market Crash of 1929.

Like most other businesses around the world, the Cuban cigar industry faced financial hardships. In 1930, the firm of Fernández, Palicio y Cía bought up the brand, where it became one of the company's headlining cigar marques, along with Belinda, La Escepción, and Hoyo de Monterrey, and maintained its popularity with British cigar smokers.

After the embargo was set against Cuba by the United States, Fernando Palicio fled Cuba for Florida, where he subsequently sold his cigar lines to Frank Llaneza and Dan Blumenthal of Villazon & Co., which has continued to make Punch, Hoyo de Monterrey, and Belinda cigars from Honduran tobacco for the American market.

Cuba subsequently nationalized the tobacco industry and Punch continued production and is still a popular, multi-locally-marketed Cuban cigar line. Among connoisseurs, the eponymous Punch, Double Corona, Churchill, and Super Selection No. 2 are especially prized and sought after.

Punch also produces two machine-made cigarillos: the Cigarritos and Cigarritos Reserva.

Punch has two Edición Limitada production cigars. One was released in 2013, and the other in 2017. It is also extremely popular as a brand for the Edicion Regional series of cigars produced by Habanos for local markets.

=== Vitolas in the Punch Line ===
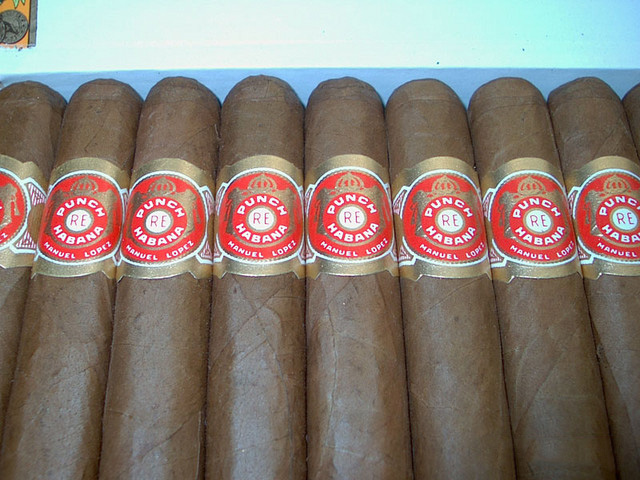
A box of Punch Punch

The following list of vitolas de salida (commercial vitolas) within the Punch marque lists their size and ring gauge in Imperial (and Metric), their vitolas de galera (factory vitolas), and their common name in American cigar slang.

Hand-Made Vitolas

- Churchill - 7" × 47 (178 × 18.65 mm), Julieta No. 2, a churchill
- Corona - 5 5/8" × 42 (143 × 16.67 mm), Corona, a corona
- Coronation - 5 1/8" × 42 (130 × 16.67 mm), Petit Corona, a petit corona
- Double Corona - 7 5/8" × 49 (194 × 19.45 mm), Prominente, a double corona
- Margarita - 4 3/4" × 26 (121 × 10.32 mm), Carolina, a small panetela
- Petit Corona del Punch - 5 1/8" × 42 (130 × 16.67 mm), Mareva, a petit corona
- Petit Coronation - 4 5/8" × 40 (117 × 15.88 mm), Coronita, a petit corona
- Petit Punch - 4" × 40 (102 × 15.88 mm), Perla, a tres petit corona
- Punch - 5 5/8" × 46 (143 × 18.26 mm), Corona Gorda, a grand corona
- Royal Coronation - 5 3/4" × 44 (146 × 17.46 mm), Conserva, a long corona
- Royal Selection No. 11 - 5 5/8" × 46 (143 × 18.26 mm), Corona Gorda, a grand corona
- Royal Selection No. 12 - 5 1/8" × 42 (130 × 16.67 mm), Mareva, a petit corona
- Super Selection No. 1 - 6 1/8" × 42 (156 × 16.67 mm), Corona Grande, a long corona

Edición Limitada Releases

- Serie d'Oro No. 2 (2013) - 5 1/2" × 50 (140 × 20 mm), Campanas, a pyramid or torpedo
- Regios de Punch (2017) - 4 7/10" × 48 (120 × 19.1 mm), Hermoso Especial, a corona extra

Edición Regional Releases

- Superfino (Italy 2005, 2006) - 4 3/8" × 42 (110 × 16.67 mm), Minuto, a tres petit corona
- Robusto (Switzerland 2005, 2007) - 4 7/8" × 50 (124 × 19.84 mm), Robusto, a robusto
- Super Robusto (Asia Pacific 2006, 2007) - 6 1/8" × 50 (155 × 19.84 mm) Doble, a toro
- Robusto (United Arab Emirates 2008) - 4 7/8" × 50 (124 × 19.84 mm), Robusto, a robusto
- Serie d'Oro No. 1 (UK 2008) - 6 1/8" × 52 (156 × 20.64 mm) Pirámide, a pyramid or torpedo
- Punch Royal (Benelux 2009) - 5 1/2" × 50 (141 × 19.84 mm) Goridto, a robusto extra
- Small Club (France 2009) - 4" × 50 (102 × 19.84 mm) Petit Robusto, a petit robusto
- Platino (India 2009) - 7 5/8" × 49 (194 × 19.45 mm) Prominente, a double corona
- Diadema (Italy 2009) - 9 1/8" × 55 (233 × 21.83 mm) Diadema, a diadema
- Northern Lights (Nordic Countries 2009) - 4 3/8" × 52 (110 × 20.64 mm) Petit Edmundo, a petit robusto
- Poderoso (Switzerland 2009) - 6 1/2" × 54 (164 × 21.43 mm) Sublime, a toro

== Footnotes ==
- Min Ron Nee with Adriano Martinez Ruis, An Illustrated Encyclopaedia of Post-Revolution Havana Cigars. Hong Kong: Interpro Business Corp., 2003.
- "Ramón Allones - Cuban Cigar Website". www.cubancigarwebsite.com.

== See also ==
- Cigar brands
