= Partagás =

Brand name of cigars

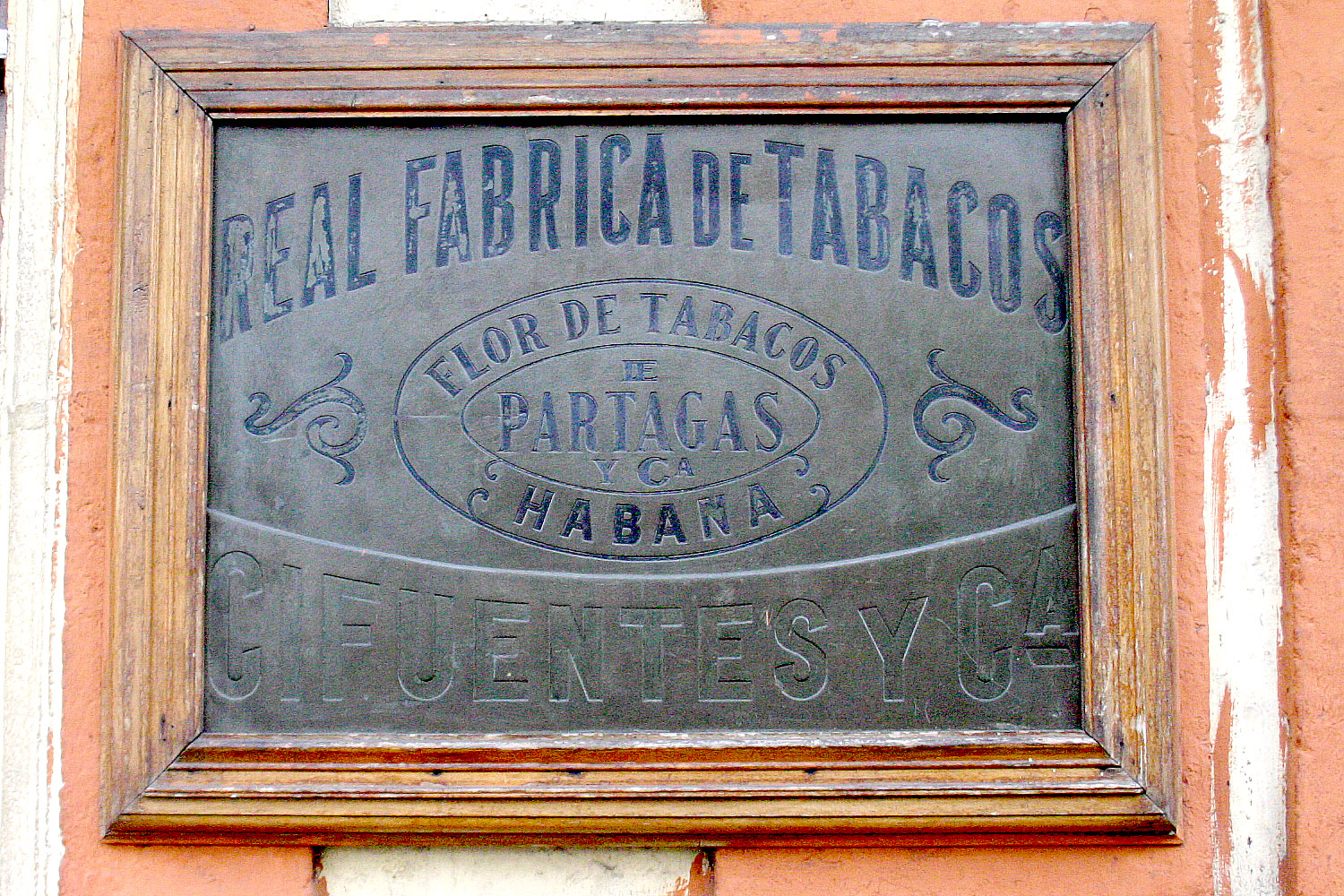
- Industry: Tobacco industry
- Genre: Cigars
- Headquarters: Havana, Cuba
- Products: Cigars

A box of Cuban-made Partagás Shorts.

Partagás is a brand name of cigars that are made by two independent & competing entities, one produced on the island of Cuba for Habanos SA, the Cuban state-owned tobacco company; (Spanish: Empresa estatal cubana de tabaco) the other, containing no Cuban tobacco, produced in the Dominican Republic for General Cigar Company, a division of Scandinavian Tobacco Group of Denmark.

The Cuban version is the original and among the oldest extant cigar brands, established in Havana in 1845.

== Cuban Partagás ==
=== History ===
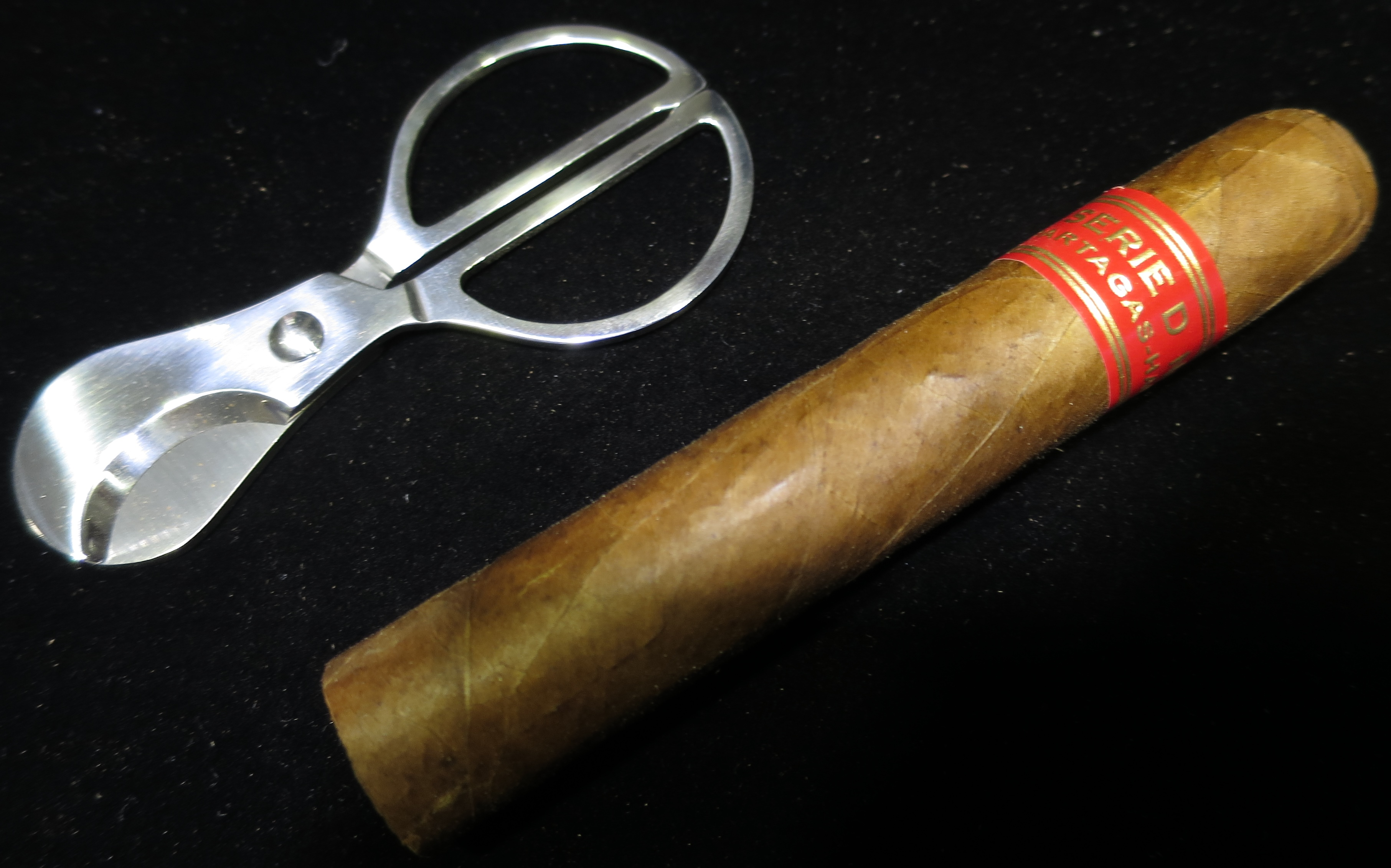
Partagás Serie D No.4

The Catalan Don Jaime Partagás y Ravell (Arenys de Mar, 1816 - Vuelta abajo, Cuba, 1868) was the son of Jaume Partagás (tailor) and Teresa Ravell. He migrated to Cuba in 1831 and worked for Lloret de Mar businessman, Joan Conill in Havana. Establishing his own factory, La Flor de Tabacas de Partagás in 1845, at 1 Cristina St. in Havana (later relocated to Calle Industria), Don Jaime owned many plantations in the Vuelta Abajo tobacco-growing region of Cuba. Don Jaime's ability to choose from among the finest tobaccos on the island, and an instinct for blending and fermenting tobaccos made the brand incredibly successful. Don Jaime is also legendarily credited with hiring one of the first lectors to entertain the cigar rollers as they worked.

Don Jaime was murdered on one of his plantations in 1868 and his son José Partagás took over the business. Later the factory and brand were sold to banker José A. Bances. In 1899, Bances invited Ramón Cifuentes Llano (1854-1938), a tabaquero from Ribadesella Spain – to join him as partner. Bances sold his remaining shares to Cifuentes the following year. Cifuentes took over management of Partagás with José Fernández López and was joined in 1916 by the Galician vegas owner and leaf wholesaler, Francisco Pego Pita, who in turn sold the company to Cifuentes, Fernández y Cía in 1900. In 1916, Don José Fernández left the firm and Ramón Cifuentes Llano joined with Francisco Pego Pita to form Cifuentes, Pego y Cía. In 1927, it acquired the rights to the Ramón Allones brand; at some unknown point the factory began to produce a brand in its own name, Cifuentes.

Ramón Cifuentes Llano died in 1938 and Pego in 1940, leaving his three sons in charge of Partagas. Ramón Cifuentes Toriello and his two brothers continued to build the increasingly prestigious factory and brand, and renamed the company Cifuentes y Cía. In 1954, the Cifuentes family acquired the Bolívar and La Gloria Cubana brands from José F. Rocha and moved their production to the Cifuentes factory. By 1958 Partagás was second only to the H. Upmann company in exporting Cuban cigars, accounting for over a quarter of all exported tobacco goods.

On September 15, 1960, Fidel Castro's revolutionary Cuban government seized 16 cigar factories, including the Partagas factory and related assets. At 6:30 p.m. soldiers entered the Partagas fabrica and encountered Ramón Cifuentes Toriello. "They came inside and said, 'We're here to intervene the company,' Cifuentes recalled in 1991. "And they didn't allow me to take anything from there." The Partagás brand was later selected for continued production under Cuban state government control, first by Cubatobaco and later Habanos S.A.

Before and after the Cuban Revolution, the Cuban-produced Partagás has continued to be one of Cuba's best-selling cigar brands. By the middle 1990s it was second in sales only to Montecristo, with annual sales of approximately 10 million cigars.

The old Partagás Factory in Havana, since renamed "Francisco Pérez Germán", was responsible for the production of much of the brand until it was relocated 3 km from Havana Vieja. A new factory now produces most vitolas. Both locations are popular tourist destinations for cigar smokers vacationing in Cuba. The move to the new factory took place on January 2, 2012.

In 2002, Altadis bought a controlling share in the Cuban government-owned cigar distributor, Habanos SA, and instituted a number of changes in cigar production. Among them was gradually turning the various brands of Cuban cigars to either all-handmade or all-machine-made lines, reducing the number of redundant sizes within a brand, and eliminating many low-selling cigars. Many of Partagás lesser-known handmade and all machine-made cigars were cut from production. Today, all Cuban Partagás cigar vitolas are hand-made.

Since the introduction of the Edición Limitada annual releases, Partagás has produced a special size almost every year: the Pirámide in 2000, the Serie D No. 3 in 2001, the Serie D No. 2 in 2003, the Serie D No. 1 in 2004, a reissue of the Serie D No. 3 in 2006, and the Serie D No. 5 in 2008. In 2005, Partagás introduced a pyramid, the Serie P No. 2.

Partagás also offers two machine-made cigarillos—‌the Mini and the club—‌as well as branded cigarettes.

=== Vitolas in the Partagás Line ===
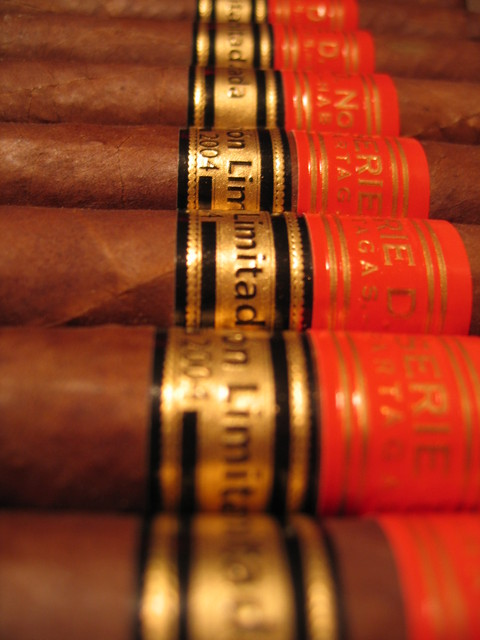
Partagás Serie D No. 1, Edición Limitada 2004.

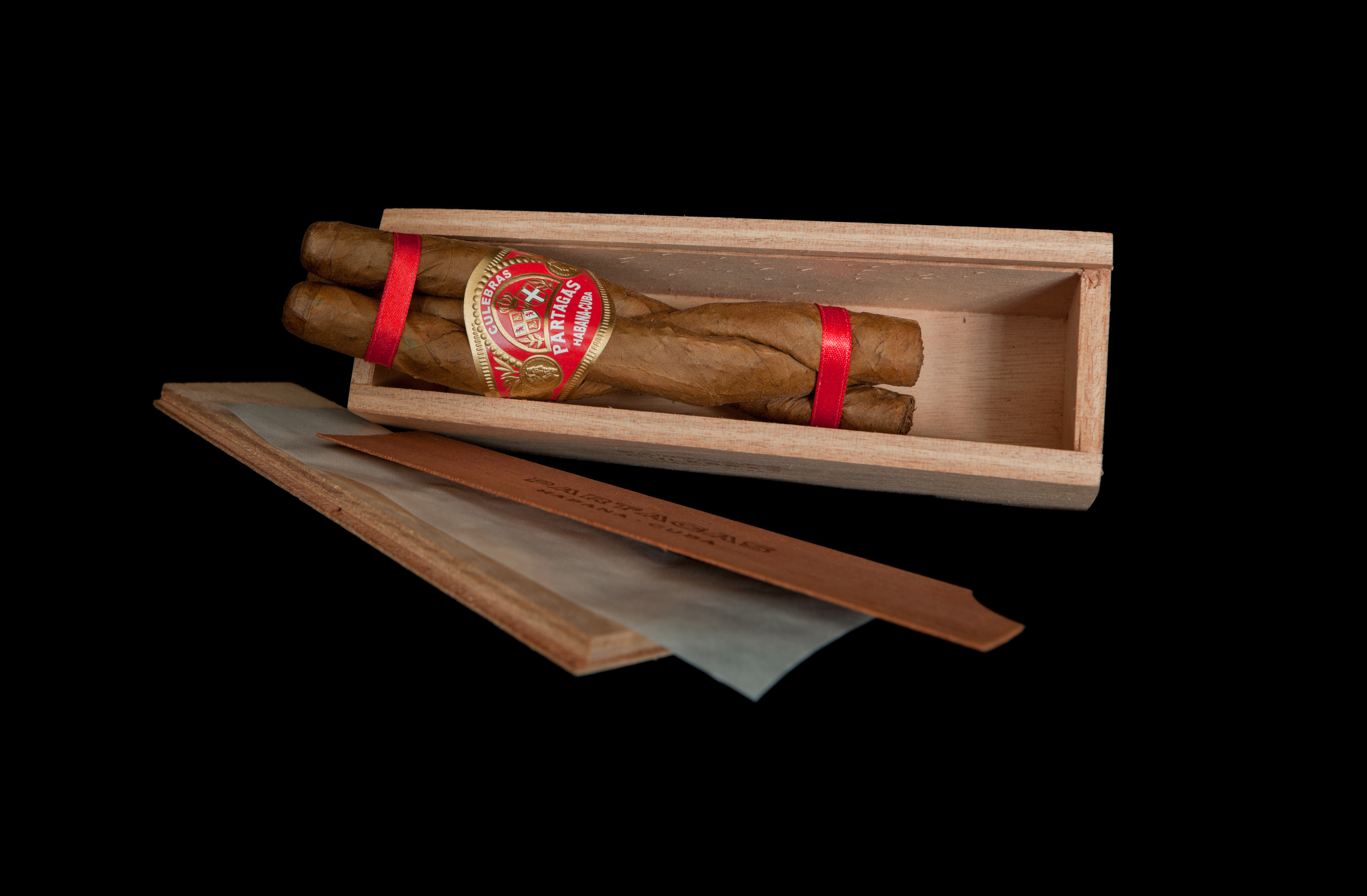
Partagás Culebras with box.

The following list of vitolas de salida (commercial vitolas) within the Partagás marque lists their size and ring gauge in Imperial (and Metric), their vitolas de galera (factory vitolas), and their English translation.

Hand-Made Vitolas

- 898 Cabinet Selección Varnished - 6 3/4" × 43 (171 × 17.07 mm), Dalia, a lonsdale
- Aristocrat - 5 1/8" × 40 (130 × 15.88 mm), Petit Cetro, a petit corona
- Corona Junior - 4 5/8" × 40 (117 × 15.88 mm), Coronita, a petit corona
- Corona Senior - 5 1/4" × 42 (133 × 16.67 mm), Eminente, a corona
- Culebras - 5 3/4" × 39 (146 × 15.48 mm), Culebras, a culebra
- Habanero - 4 7/8" × 39 (124 × 15.48 mm), Belvedere, a short panetela
- Lusitania - 7 5/8" × 49 (194 × 19.45 mm), Prominente, a double corona
- Mille Fleurs - 5 1/8" × 42 (130 × 16.67 mm), Petit Corona, a petit corona
- No. 1 - 6 3/4" × 43 (171 × 17.07 mm), Dalia, a lonsdale
- Partagás de Luxe - 5 1/2" × 40 (140 × 15.88 mm), Crema, a corona
- Petit Corona Especial - 5 1/4" × 42 (133 × 16.67 mm), Eminente, a corona
- Presidente - 6 1/4" × 47 (159 × 18.65 mm), Taco, a perfecto
- Princess - 5" × 35 (127 × 13.89 mm), Conchita, a short panetela
- Serie du Connaisseur No. 1 - 7 1/2" × 38 (191 × 15.08 mm), Delicado, a long panetela
- Serie du Connaisseur No. 2 - 6 1/2" × 38 (165 × 15.08 mm), Parejo, a panetela
- Serie du Connaisseur No. 3 - 5 5/8" × 35 (143 × 13.89 mm), Carlota, a panetela
- Serie D No. 4 - 4 7/8" × 50 (124 × 19.84 mm), Robusto, a robusto
- Serie D No. 5 - 4 1/3" × 50 (110 × 19.84 mm), Serie D No. 5, a petit robusto
- Serie D No. 6 - 3 1/2" × 50 (90 × 19.84 mm), Serie D No. 6, a petit robusto
- Serie E No. 2 - 5.5" x 54 (140 x 21.43 mm), Duke, a robusto extra
- Serie P No. 2 - 6 1/8" × 52 (156 × 20.64 mm), Pirámide, a pyramid
- Short - 4 3/8" × 42 (111 × 16.67 mm), Minuto, a petit corona
- Super Partagás - 5 1/2" × 40 (140 × 15.88 mm), Crema, a corona

Edición Limitada Releases

- Pirámide (2000) - 6 1/8" × 52 (156 × 20.64 mm), Pirámide, a pyramid
- Serie D No. 3 (2001/re-release in 2006), - 5 5/8" × 46 (143 × 18.26 mm), Corona Gorda, a grand corona
- Serie D No. 2 (2003) - 6 1/8" × 50 (156 × 19.84 mm), Doble, a robusto extra
- Serie D No. 1 (2004) - 6 3/4" × 50 (171 × 19.84 mm), Partagás No. 16, a double robusto
- Serie D No. 5 (2008) - 4 1/3" × 50 (110 × 19.84 mm), Serie D No. 5, a petit robusto
- Serie D Especial (2010) - 5.6" x 50 (141 x 50), Gordito, a robusto extra
- Serie C No. 3 (2012) - 5.5" x 48 (140 x 48), Hermoso No. 3, a grand corona

== The most sold Cuban Cigar ==
The Partagás Serie D No. 4 is widely regarded as the most sold Cuban cigar globally. Introduced in 1975, it has become the most sold Cuban cigars worldwide in the early 2010s, surpassing the Montecristo No.4.

== General Cigar Company's Partagás ==
Following the Cuban Revolution and the seizure of the Partagás factory, the Cifuentes family's patriarch, Ramón Cifuentes Toriello, was initially offered the job of heading Cuba's new state-owned tobacco monopoly, but refused and instead emigrated from the country, moving to the United States.

After working for years in the cigar industry, Ramon Cifuentes Toriello re-launched the brands Partagás and Bolívar cigars with the General Cigar Company, which in 1978 obtained a trademark for the American market. Initial production took place in Jamaica, but the following year production of the revisited brand moved to a modern factory in Santiago, the second largest city of the Dominican Republic.

In 1995 the 70,000-square-foot (6,500 m^{2}) Santiago facility employed approximately 600 workers, who produced cigars bearing both the Partagas and Macanudo labels. Approximately 8 million Partagás cigars were produced by General Cigar Dominicana in that year.

A similar trade dress to the Cuban product has been used by General Cigar for its competing version of the Partagás brand, employing a red-and-gold band scheme, save with the word "Habana" replaced by the date "1845" on the packaging.

== See also ==
- List of cigar brands
