= General Cigar Company =

- Industry: Tobacco
- Predecessor: Cullman Brothers
- Founded: 1906; 120 years ago in Evansville, Indiana, US
- Headquarters: Richmond, Virginia
- Area served: Worldwide
- Key people: Regis Broersma (President)
- Products: Premium Cigar and Pipe Tobacco
- Parent: Scandinavian Tobacco Group

General Cigar Company is the largest manufacturer of premium cigars in the world. It is a subsidiary of Scandinavian Tobacco Group with North American headquarters located in Richmond, Virginia.

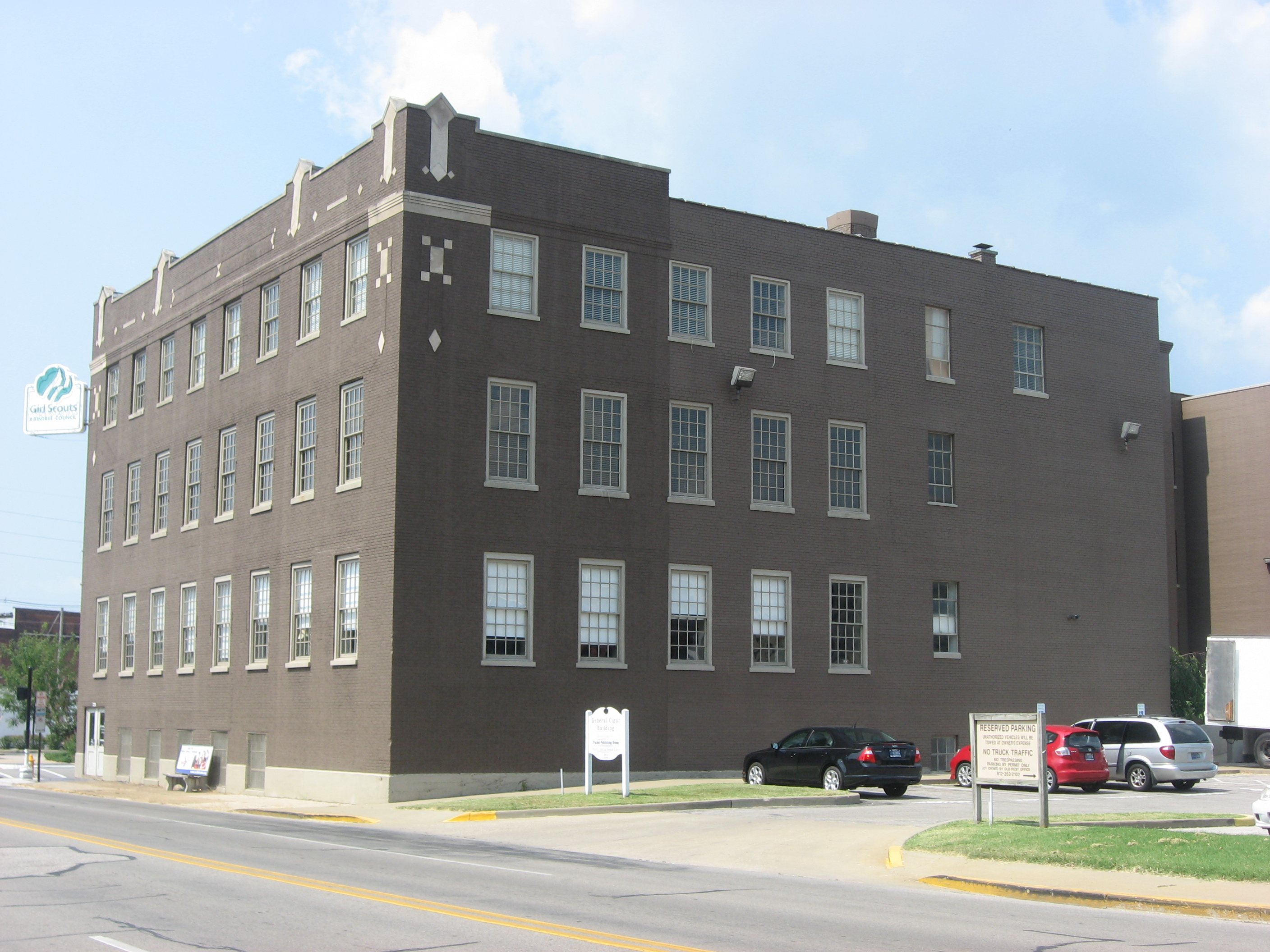
General Cigar Company

== Company history ==
In 1961 General Cigar, which was profitably selling about $30 million worth of cigars annually, was purchased for approximately $25 million by a group of investors headed by Edgar M. Cullman (brother of then Philip Morris Company CEO Joseph Cullman), a fourth generation American in the tobacco industry.

Later in the 1960s, Culbro and General Cigar acquired Gradiaz Annis, maker of Gold Label cigars and the Temple Hall factory that owned the Macanudo brand name, ushering in a turn towards hand-rolled premium cigars. Macanudo, a small label made in limited quantities for the market in the United Kingdom, was seen as the principal vehicle for growth in the premium cigar category. A careful effort was made to reblend the product for the large American marketplace (then and now subject to a ban on Cuban tobacco, the industry's gold standard) using select binder and filler from the Dominican Republic, Jamaica, and Mexico and Connecticut shade-grown wrapper. Mass advertising was conducted in support of the brand, which by the early 1990s had grown into the best selling premium cigar label in the United States.

In 1978 General registered a U.S. trademark on the brand name "Cohiba", thereby obtaining the right to use the name of that premium Cuban cigar in the American market without any connection to or content provided by its Cuban maker. Protracted legal wrangling followed, resolved when the U. S. Supreme Court denied the petition of the Cuban tobacco marketing agency, Cubatabaco, in 2006. General Cigar's Cohiba cigars bear a disclaimer stating that they are not affiliated in any way with the Cuban Cohiba brand.

From 1978 General Cigar has also produced the Cuban tobacco free Partagas and Bolivar cigar brands for the American market in competition with Cuban brands of the same name. Initial production of Partagas was conducted in Jamaica, but the following year production moved to a modern 70,000-square-foot (6,500 m^{2}) factory in Santiago, Dominican Republic.

A similar trade dress to the Cuban product has been used by General Cigar for its competing version of the Partagás brand, employing a red-and-gold band scheme, save with the word "Habana" replaced by the date "1845" on the packaging.

In 1997, General Cigar acquired Villazon, a company marketing non-Cuban versions of the leading Cuban cigar brands Punch and Hoyo de Monterrey.

In 2005, Swedish Match acquired General Cigar. In 2010, Swedish Match merged its premium cigars into Scandinavian Tobacco Group.

In 2016, Swedish Match sold its shares of General Cigar back to STG.

In January 2021, Scandinavian Tobacco Group A/S (STG), the company behind General Cigar and Cigars International, announced the formation of a new company, The Forged Cigar Company, an independent national cigar distribution network. The cigar brands under General Cigar were split up between General and Forged with the latter focusing more on Brick and Mortar business.

The first brands that were moved to The Forged Cigar Company were Partagas, La Gloria Cubana, Bolivar Cofradia, Diesel and Chillin’ Moose. Brands that remained with General included CAO, Cohiba, Hoyo de Monterrey, Macanudo, and Punch. Later the El Rey Del Mundo brand was added to Forged's portfolio.

== General Cigar's brands ==
- Ramone Allones (non-Cuban production in competition with the Cuban brand)
- Bolivar (non-Cuban production in competition with the Cuban brand)
- CAO
- Cohiba (non-Cuban production in competition with the Cuban brand)
- Don Tomás
- Excalibur
- Foundry
- Diesel
- Helix
- La Gloria Cubana (non-Cuban production in competition with the Cuban brand)
- Hoyo de Monterrey (non-Cuban production in competition with the Cuban brand)
- Macanudo
- Inspirado (Macanudo line extension)
- Partagas (non-Cuban production in competition with the Cuban brand)
- Punch (non-Cuban production in competition with the Cuban brand)
- El Rico Habano
- Sancho Panza (non-Cuban production in competition with the Cuban brand)
- Temple Hall
- Toraño
- Brioso
- La Estrella Cubana
- Odyssey

== Historic building ==
- General Cigar Company
- U.S. National Register of Historic Places
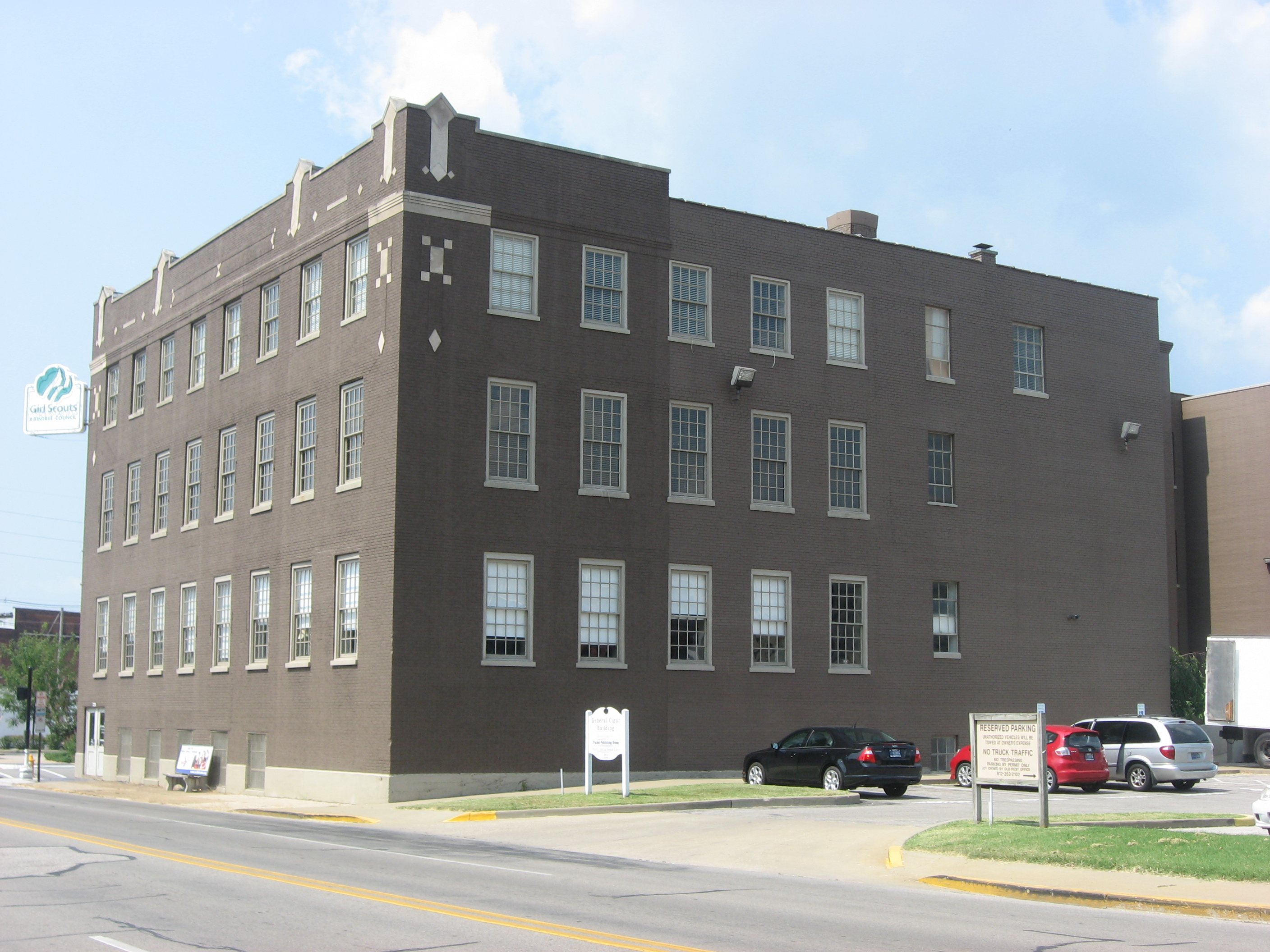
- Southern side of the building

- Location within Indiana Location within the United States
- Location: 223 NW 2nd St., Evansville, Indiana
- Coordinates: 37°57′51″N 87°34′30″W
- Area: Less than 1 acre (0.40 ha)
- Built: 1902
- Built by: Harry Boyle and Company; Alfred E. Neucks
- Architectural style: Arts and Crafts
- NRHP reference No.: 00000212
- Added to NRHP: March 15, 2000

The General Cigar Company building at Evansville, Indiana, was built in 1902, and expanded in 1929. It is a three-story, L-shaped red brick building with Arts and Crafts style design elements. It was listed on the National Register of Historic Places in 2000.

== See also ==
- List of cigar brands
