= Connecticut shade tobacco =

Agricultural product

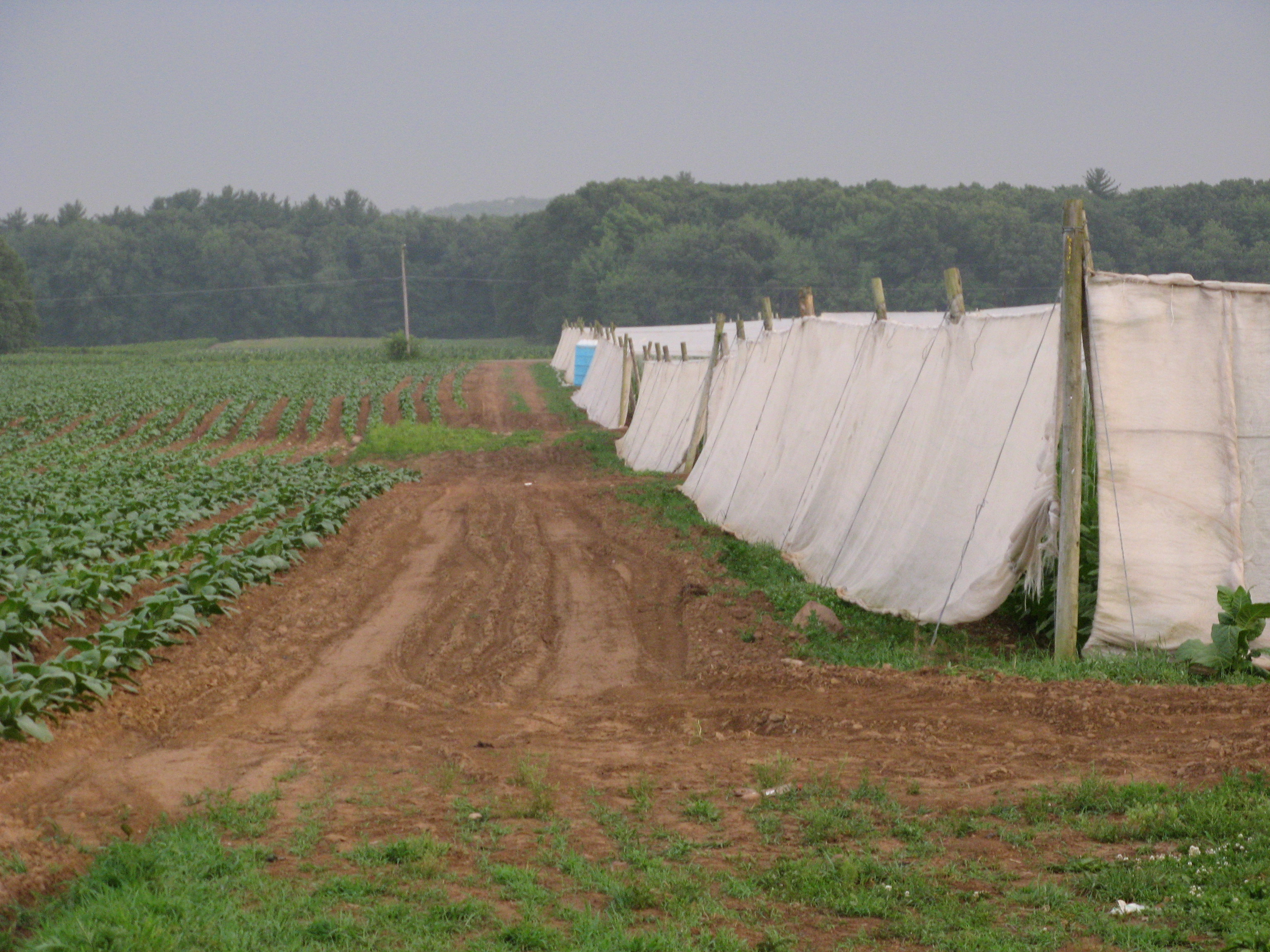
Tobacco field with shade tents in East Windsor, Connecticut

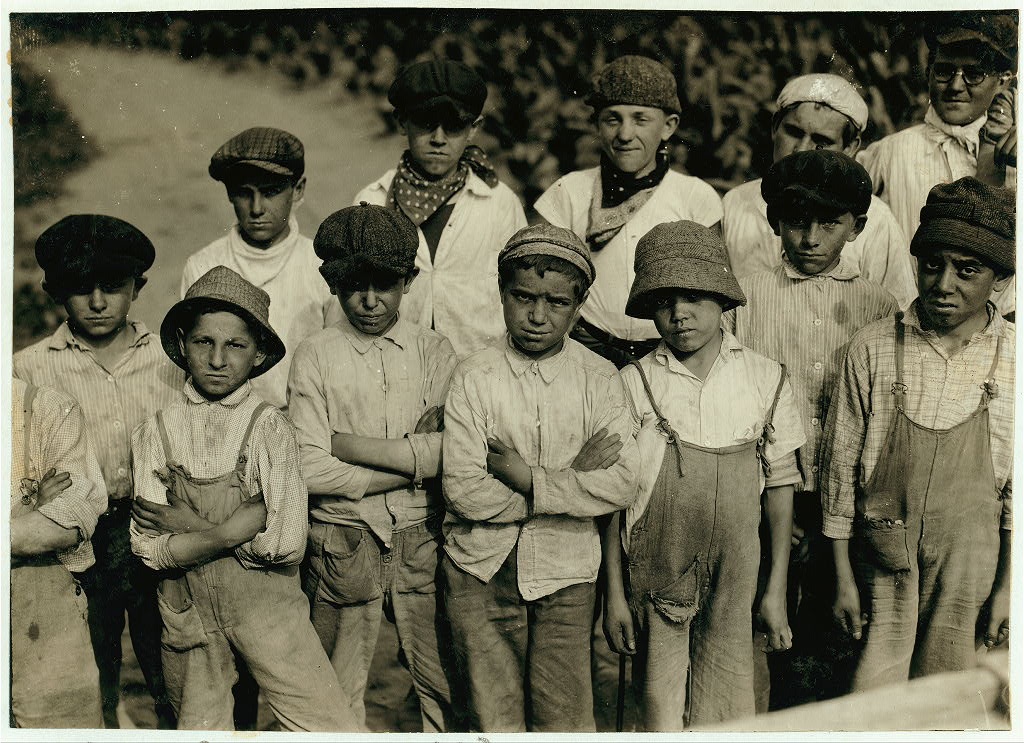
Field workers, all children, at the Goodrich Tobacco Farm near Gildersleeve, Connecticut, 1917

Connecticut shade tobacco is a tobacco grown under shade in the Connecticut River valley of Connecticut, Massachusetts, and southern Vermont. It is used primarily for binder and wrapper for premium cigars, and is prized for its color and quality, its subtle sweetness and refined flavor. By 2025, only 35 acres of Connecticut shade tobacco were grown, all of it on one farm in Massachusetts. Other growers have either left the industry or switched to Connecticut Broadleaf tobacco.

== History ==
Tobacco farming in the Connecticut River valley has a long history. When the first settlers came to the valley in the 1630s, tobacco was already being grown by the native population. The town of Windsor is the epicenter of the tobacco industry in Connecticut. The town was founded in 1633 and within seven years it was producing tobacco for personal use and profit. The tobacco being grown was for pipe use, brought up from Virginia since the tobacco variety found in the Connecticut Valley was not as delectable as the Virginian style. It was immediately apparent that the soil from the river, a rich sandy loam, and the hot and short summer of New England yielded an excellent crop each year. Approximately 34,000 acres (140 km^{2}) of land in Connecticut is covered by Windsor Soil, named after the town of Windsor.

Eventually, the popularity of cigars became greater than the pipe. Initially, a tobacco leaf type named Shoestring was grown. This was replaced by broadleaf tobacco, which was the variety that dominated the industry. It was in such high demand that during the Civil War the Connecticut Valley yielded up to ten million pounds per year. The fame of quality Connecticut tobacco was raved about throughout the settled regions of the United States. Today, Connecticut Broadleaf tobacco has predominantly been grown in the U.S. South, being one of the major tobaccos grown in the states of Kentucky and Tennessee.

By 1700, tobacco was being exported via the Connecticut River to European ports. The use of Connecticut Valley tobacco as a cigar wrapper leaf began in the 1820s. Area farmers grew tobacco for the two outside layers of cigars, the binder and the wrapper. By the 1830s, tobacco farmers were experimenting with different seeds and processing techniques. Knowing that they were not the only players in the cigar wrapper economy, farmers began planting a new tobacco species in 1875, the Havana Seed. This smooth, good-looking leaf yielded a higher percent of quality cigar wrappers.

Just a few decades later, in the late 19th century, a fine grained leaf type imported from Sumatra was adopted for growth in Connecticut.

The demand for high quality cigar wrapper was never ending. This pushed Connecticut growers and scientists to develop a leaf so smooth and golden that it would dominate the market. Farmers and scientists worked together to develop a hybrid to overcome competition from Cuba and Asia. Using over thirty samples from Cuba and Sumatra, Shade Tobacco was born in 1900, and the first shade-leaf tent was put up on River Street in Windsor. The shade tents made of cloth cut sunlight and raised humidity.

== Production ==
The technique of growing shade tobacco has changed little in the past hundred years. Shade tents are formed by posts set in a grid pattern covered by a light, durable fabric (once cotton but now a synthetic fiber), sometimes also draped along the sides. The fabric diffuses the sunlight, helps retain natural humidity, and maintain a slightly warmer ambient temperature. The result is a thinner and more elastic tobacco leaf that cures to a lighter, even color than sun grown tobacco, often desired by Cuban and Dominican cigar producers.

While the 1920 Prohibition ceased legal sales of alcohol in Connecticut, tobacco production reached a peak there. At its height, there was greater than 20,000 acres (81 km^{2}) of shade grown product under cultivation under shade in the Connecticut Valley.

As a consequence of increased competition from growers of "Connecticut" wrapper in Central America, where production costs are substantially lower, a decreased demand for cigars generally, and an increase in the appeal of darker and thicker broadleaf tobacco wrappers, there has been a dramatic decline in shade tobacco production in the Connecticut River Valley. Production had dwindled to just over 2,000 acres (8.1 km^{2}) by the middle of the first decade of the 2000s. By 2011, plantings were down to about 700 acres a year, and by 2017 those plantings had further declined about 80%, with one of the largest producers of shade grown tobacco, O.J. Thrall, placing over 300 acres of prime land up for sale. Pockets of the crop amounting to a mere 150 acres or so briefly remained in production in Connecticut towns such as Windsor, East Windsor, Suffield, and Enfield.

== Quality ==
Windsor tobacco leaves in particular are highly prized by fine cigar makers, and are used as the cigar's outer wrapping. The former president of U.S. operations for Davidoff, a Swiss maker of luxury goods including premium cigars, praised Connecticut shade tobacco as "[a] nice Connecticut wrapper" and "very silky, very fine. From a marketing point of view”, and “one of the best tasting and looking wrappers available", in a 1992 Cigar Aficionado article on why many of the world's best cigars of that day used Connecticut tobacco wrapper leaves.

== In popular culture ==
The 1952 novel East of Eden by John Steinbeck is set partially on a farm in Connecticut, where character Charles Trask improves the land in part by planting tobacco.

The 1958 novel and 1961 motion picture titled Parrish featured the shade tobacco industry in and around Hartford in the '40s and '50s.
