= Physica Curiosa =

Encyclopaedia of the natural sciences published in 1662 by Gaspar Schott

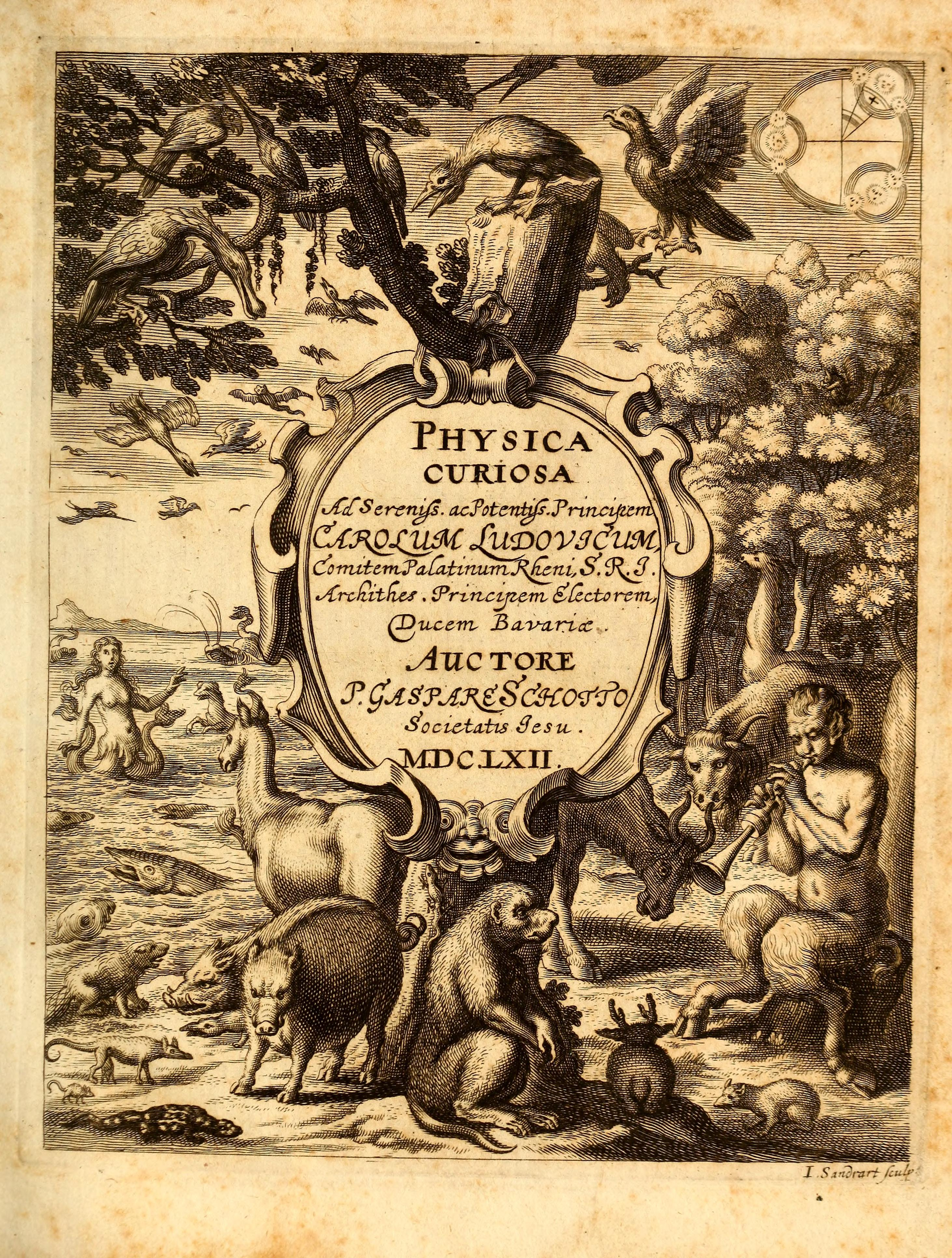
- Frontispiece dedicated to Charles I Louis, Count Palatine of the Rhine
- Authors: Gaspar Schott
- Illustrator: Susanne Maria von Sandrart
- Cover artist: Jacob von Sandrart
- Language: Latin
- Series: 12 volumes
- Subject: Natural History
- Published: 1662, 1667, 1686
- Publication place: Holy Roman Empire

Physica Curiosa written by the German scholar, Jesuit priest and scientist Gaspar Schott is a seventeenth century encyclopedia, published first in 1662, is divided into twelve books and has been richly illustrated with prints of copper engravings. It is the first part of a two-volume work, the other being Technica Curiosa, published in 1664.

Schott primarily used works by well-known scholars and naturalists as his sources, including Ulisse Aldrovandi, Conrad Gesner, John Jonston, Conrad Lycosthenes, and Ambroise Paré. There is an emphasis on the illustrations of monsters and so-called "freaks" (deformed people). The first volume covers the miracles attributed to both angels and demons. The 11th volume is devoted entirely to the study of meteorites.

== Publication ==
Schott compiled his volumes from previously published and widely known works of authors, scholars and naturalists such as Conrad Gesner, Ulisse Aldrovandi, Joannes Jonstonus, Ambroise Paré, Conrad Lycosthenes and many others, including many of the immensely popular illustrations of monsters and physical deformities. Schott summarized: ...what was either left out in the Magia and other works, was published later by learned men, or has only recently reached me. For his own research he extensively relied on the libraries and Jesuit universities of Europe. Like most natural history publications during the early stages of the Scientific Revolution, the work is a curious conjunction between the beliefs and superstition of the time and pioneering scientific texts. The frontispiece was designed by Jacob von Sandrart. Between 500 and 1000 copies were printed in several editions by J. A. Endter & Son from Nürnberg.

The Physica Curiosa represents a small, but critical step towards the adoption of scientific reasoning as the preferred method of scholarly work.

== From superstition to reason ==
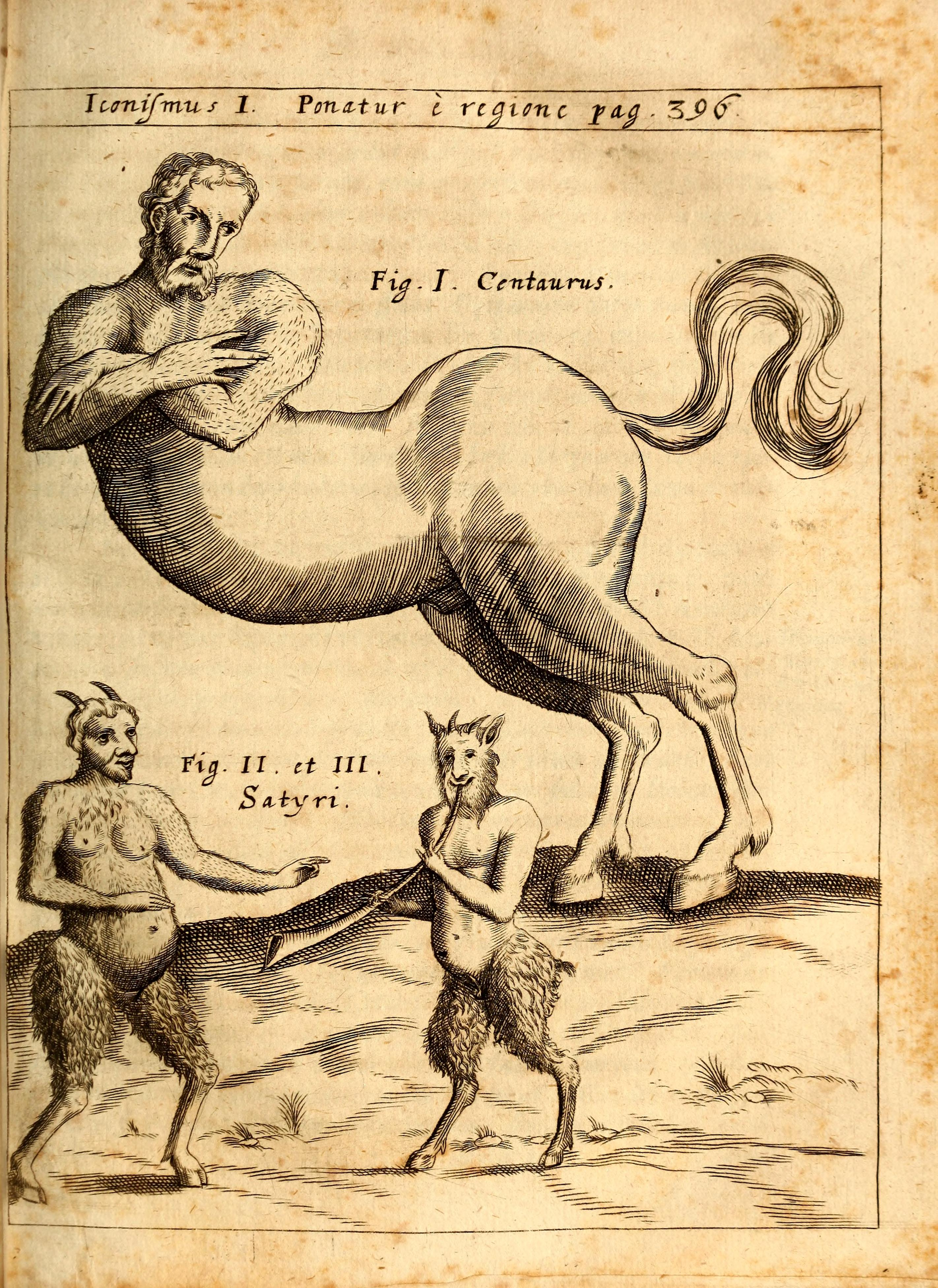
llustrations of Curiosities, Physica Curiosa

The first six books, mainly aggregations of the writings of previous authors, are dedicated to magic, perceived oddities and miracles of the spiritual world.

As mathematician and physicist Schott had developed a great interest in Otto von Guericke's work on air pressure and the vacuum pump. Both men would eventually correspond and cooperate as Schott immersed himself into extensive experiments and studies on his own and became accustomed to scientific work and observation based on reason. Thus, the second half of the Physica Curiosa is, although still full of misconceptions, an attempt to produce an account of observation of and reflection on real natural phenomena, marvels of real life, exotic animals and foreign lands. In his foreword Schott writes, that: other people have reported the wondrous things, that I am writing down here - yet they only tell. But I put most of it on the scales of truth and separate the true from the false, the real from the fake, and then I try to investigate the causes of the individual phenomena.

== Twelve books ==
Books I to VI are a summary of all natural and supernatural monstrosities known at that time, including bizarre animals and physical abnormalities and abstract ideas of the mind.

- I. Miracles of angels and demons
- II. Miracles of visions (apparitions)
- III. Wondrous things about people
- IV. Wondrous things about the possessed
- V. Wondrous things about monsters
- VI. Wondrous things about freaks

Books VII to XII concentrate on physical nature and phenomena.

- VII. Wonders of animals in general
- VIII. Wonders of land animals
- IX. Miraculous things about birds
- X. Miraculous things about aquatic animals
- XI. Miraculous things about meteorites
- XII. All sorts of wondrous things

== Impact ==
Although he still makes some incorrect assumptions and false explanations associated with the natural world, his clear division within the encyclopedia suggests, that Schott was able to reasonably distinguish between fantasy phenomena and creatures and those found naturally. Summing up his view, he writes: I do not approve of all because I know that some are doubtful, if not false. Others are superstitious and perhaps even manifestly false.

The Physica Curiosa alongside many other contemporary books of curiosities, that flourished during the 16th and 17th centuries, which contained a comprehensive body of text on fanciful beliefs of the past in a single publication, turned out to serve as an excellent subject of reference that made it easier for future enlightened scientists to pinpoint, address and argue against widespread, unscientific ideas.
