= Friedrich Dannemann =

German physicist

- Born: 1858
- Died: 1936 (aged 77–78)
- Scientific career
- Fields: History of science

(Johann) Friedrich Dannemann (1858–1936) was a German physicist, high school teacher and historian of science.

In the judgment of George Sarton, Dannemann's four-volume Natural sciences in their development and context (1910-13) was "the first satisfactory textbook dealing with the history of science as a whole". In 1927, aged sixty-eight, Dannemann became an unsalaried professor in the history of science at the University of Bonn. Dannemann also helped Abraham Wolf with his A History of Science, Technology, and Philosophy in the 16th and 17th Centuries.

== Works ==
- (ed.) Otto von Guericke's neue 'Magdeburgische' Versuche ueber den leeren Raum: 1672 [Otto von Guericke's new 'Magdeburg' experiments on empty space: 1872] by Otto von Guericke. Leipzig : Akad. Verlagsges, 1889.
- Grundriss einer Geschichte der Naturwissenschaften : zugleich eine Einführung in das Studium der naturwissenschaftlichen Litteratur [Outline of a history of the natural sciences, and an introduction to the study of natural scientific literature]. Leipzig: W. Engelmann, 1896.
- Aus der Werkstatt grosser Forscher: Allgemeinverständliche erläuterte Abschnitte aus den Werken hervorragender Naturforscher aller Völker und Zeiten [From the workshop of great researchers: universally understandable selections from the works of outstanding natural scientists of all peoples and times]. Leipzig: Engelmann, 1908.
- Die Naturwissenschaften in ihrer Entwicklung und in ihrem Zusammenhange [The natural sciences in their development and context]. 4 vols. Leipzig : Engelmann, 1910–13.
- Wie unser Weltbild entstand, die Anschauungen vom Altertum bis zur Gegenwart über den Bau des Kosmos. ['How our worldview came about: views about the structure of the cosmos from ancient times to the present]. Stuttgart: Kosmos, 1912.
