= A History of Science, Technology, and Philosophy in the 18th Century =

1939 book by Abraham Wolf

- Title page for A History of Science, Technology, and Philosophy in the 18th Century (1961)
- Author: Abraham Wolf
- Genre: Non-fiction
- Publication date: 1939

A History of Science, Technology, and Philosophy in the 18th Century is a book by Abraham Wolf first published in 1939 as a sequel to his 1935 work, A History of Science, Technology, and Philosophy in the 16th and 17th Centuries.

== Summary ==
Written by Abraham Wolf as a sequel to A History of Science, Technology, and Philosophy in the 16th and 17th Centuries (1935), the book was first published in 1939. It comprises 32 chapters, most of which pertain to the sciences, including astronomy, botany, chemistry, geology, geography, mathematics, mechanics, medicine, meteorology, physics, and zoology. Conversely, only two chapters are about philosophy.

== Reception ==
Science reviewer Frederick E. Brasch concluded that the book was a "decidedly useful compendium of scientific, technical and philosophical knowledge of the eighteenth century" but criticised its index and table of contents. Writing in The American Historical Review, Frederick Barry described Wolf's work as "readable" and "interesting". The American Journal of Psychology reviewer E. G. Boring called the book a "masterpiece of erudition". Tenney L. Davis, in the Journal of Chemical Education, called the book "truly encyclopedic in scope", but specifically criticised it for not having a "satisfying" account of chemistry in the eighteenth century.
