= Dannemann =

Danneman is a German surname. Notable people with the surname include:

- Christian Dannemann Eriksen, Danish professional footballer
- Don Dannemann, American musician and jingle writer
- Friedrich Dannemann, German physicist, high school teacher and historian of science
- Geraldo Dannemann, founder of Dannemann Cigars
- Karl Dannemann (22 March 1896 – 4 May 1945) was a German actor
- Monika Dannemann, German figure skater and painter
- Robert Dannemann (6 February 1902 – 28 September 1965) was a German politician, M.P.
- Steve Dannenmann, American poker player

== See also ==
- Daneman
- Danimann
