= Daneman =

Daneman is a surname. Notable people with the surname include:

- Paul Daneman (1925–2001), English actor
- Sophie Daneman, British soprano, daughter of Paul

== See also ==
- Dannemann
