= Technica Curiosa =

1664 compendium of scientific and medical technologies published by Gaspar Schot

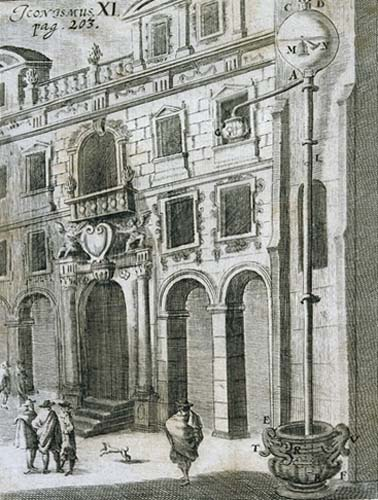
An engraving of Gasparo Berti's water column experiment from the Technica Curiosa.

Technica Curiosa was an early compendium of scientific and medical technologies. It was one part of a two-volume work, the other being Physica Curiosa, authored by the German Jesuit scholar Gaspar Schott and published in 1664 during the early stages of the Scientific Revolution.

== Background of the writer ==
Schott was an attentive spectator at the demonstrations of Otto von Guericke's vacuum pump and subsequently began extensive experiments and studies on his own. He established a fruitful correspondence with von Guericke and published the earliest account on von Guericke's experiments on air pressure and the vacuum in 1657, titled Experimentum Novum Magdeburgicum as an appendix of his Mechanica Hydraulico-pneumatica. With von Guericke as co-author, he published a reviewed and more detailed account in the Technica Curiosa.

== Role in popularizing science ==
The work ranks among the early popular science publications and did much to inspire widespread interest in the sciences.

== 21st-century legacy ==
In 2017 an online platform, that serves as host for several American science magazines for a modern audience has been titled Technica Curiosa. The site incorporates the popular magazines Popular Astronomy, Popular Electronics, and Mechanix Illustrated, among others.
