= Pantometrum Kircherianum =

1660 work by Gaspar Schott and Athanasius Kircher

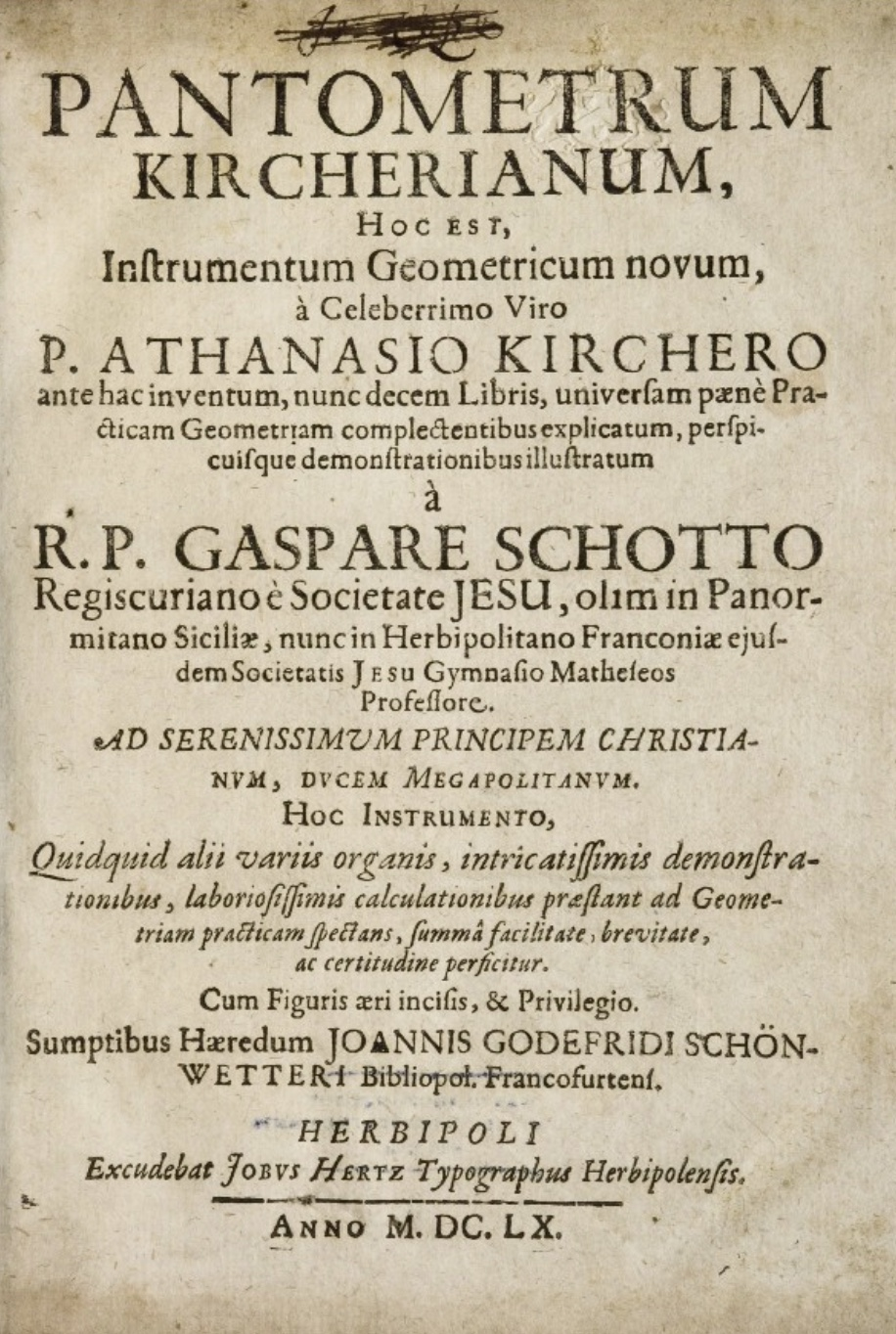
Title page of “Pantometrum Kircherianum”, Max Planck Institute for the History of Science Library

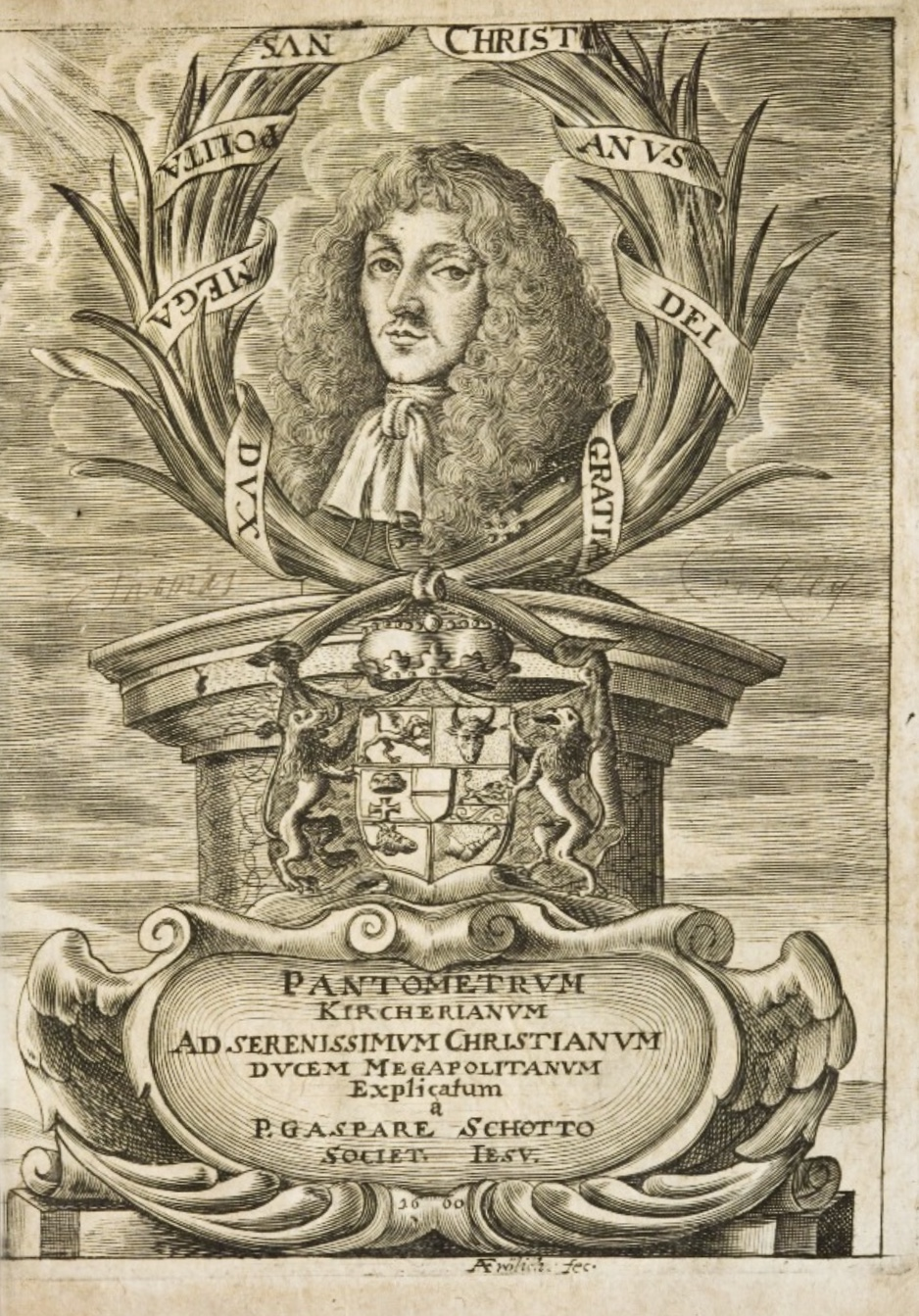
Dedication page of “Pantometrum Kircherianum”, Max Planck Institute for the History of Science Library

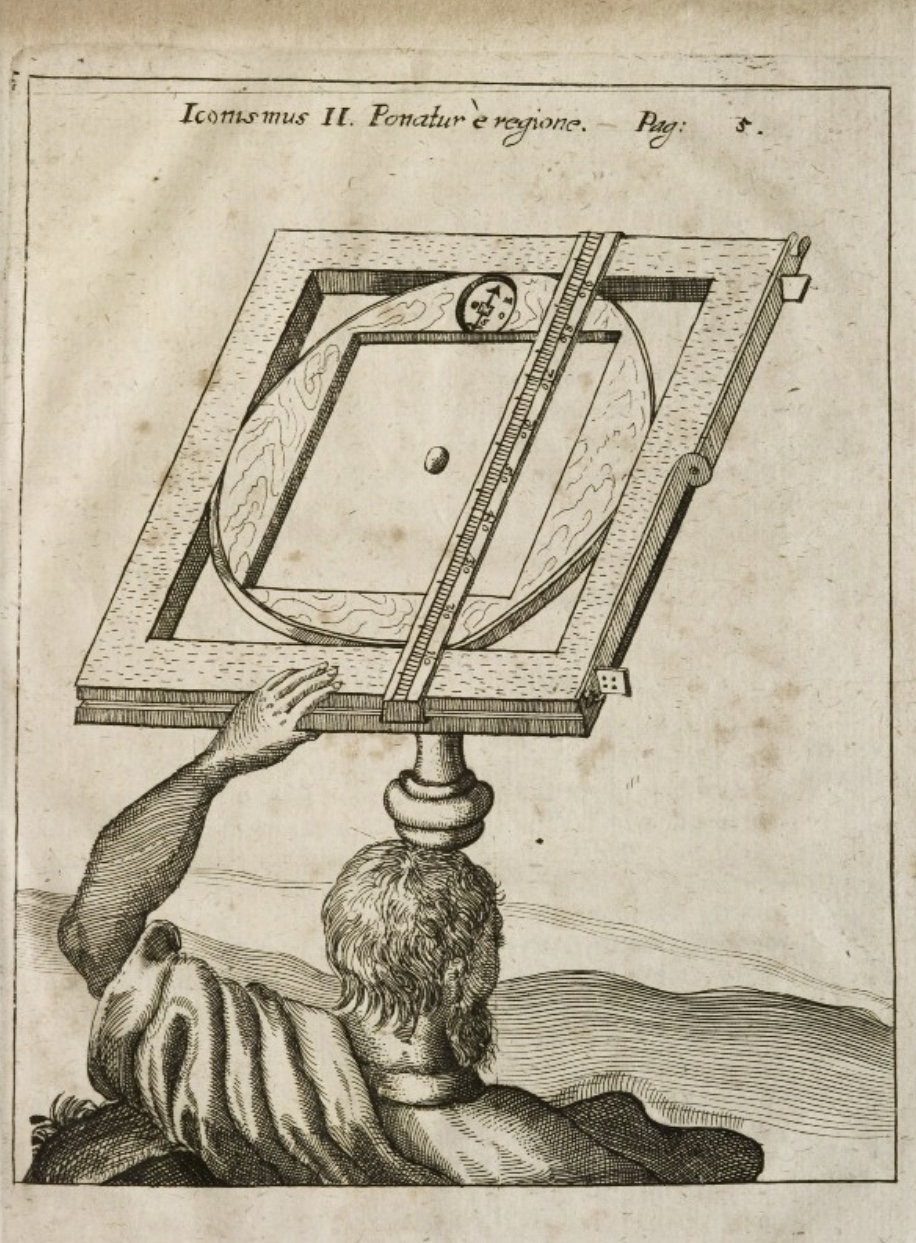
Illustration from “Pantometrum Kircherianum”, Max Planck Institute for the History of Science Library

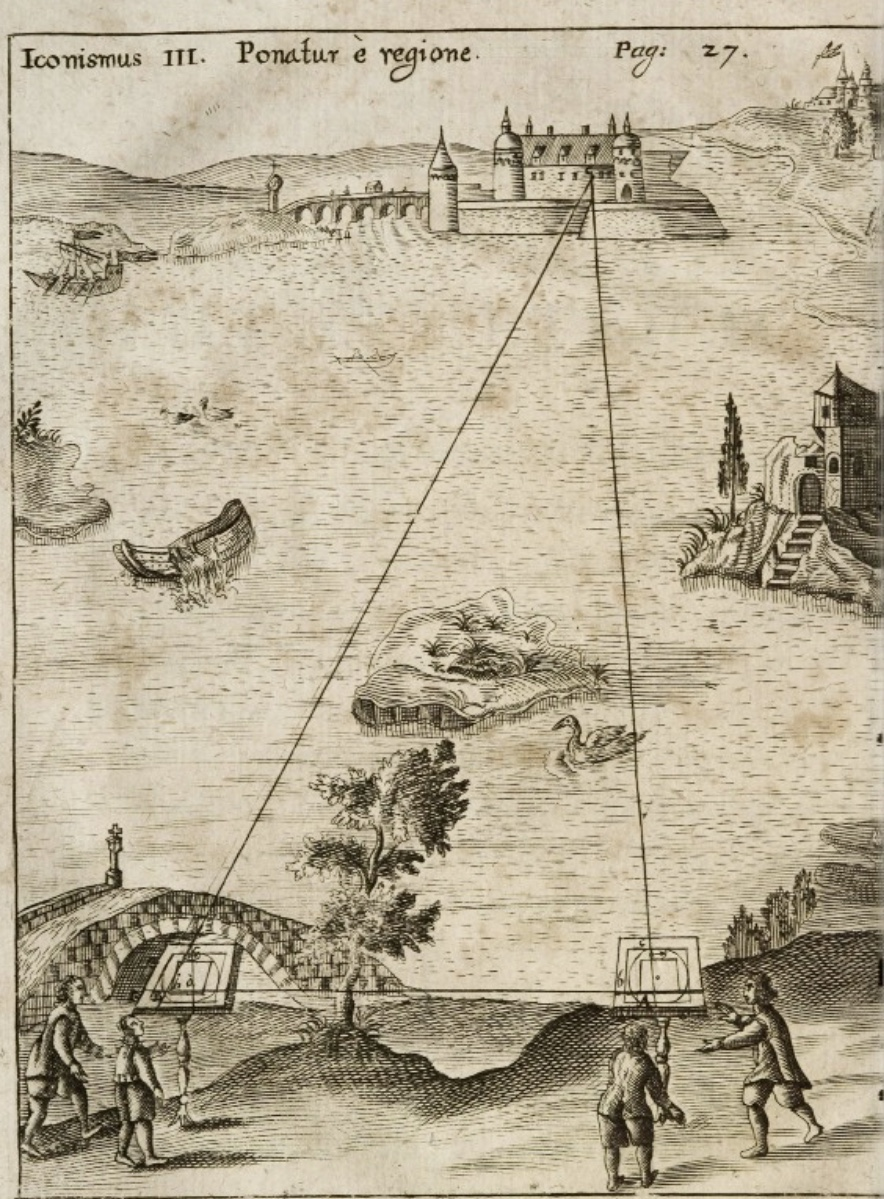
Illustration from “Pantometrum Kircherianum”, Max Planck Institute for the History of Science Library

Pantometrum Kircherianum is a 1660 work by the Jesuit scholars Gaspar Schott and Athanasius Kircher. It was dedicated to Christian Louis I, Duke of Mecklenburg and printed in Würzburg by Johann Gottfried Schönwetter. It was a description, with building instructions, of a measuring device called the pantometer, that Kircher had developed some years before. The first edition include 32 copperplate illustrations.

The book demonstrated how the device could be used to measure the distance of objects by triangulating from two different points on a baseline. Kircher had previously used the pantometer to take scientific measurements when he was lowered into the crater of Vesuvius.

== Description of the pantometer ==
The name "pantometer" derives from Greek, in which "pan" means "all" and "metron" means "measure" - indicating that this instrument can be used to measure anything. As described in the book, it consisted of a square frame, a dioptra, and a disc that fitted within the square. The disc contained a built-in compass and a space for putting a sheet of paper. The disc could turn freely within the square, or be locked in a fixed position. Mounted on this apparatus was a movable ruler parallel to the edge of the square on which the dioptra was attached. An illustration in the book showed how the device could be used to measure the distance of objects by triangulating from two different points on a baseline.

The introduction to the book emphasised both the accuracy of the device and its ease of use, and stated that it could be used to "measure all, witness latitudes, longitudes, altitudes, depths and surfaces, terrestrial and celestial bodies, and whatever indeed we are accustomed to doing with other instruments."

== Kircher's development of the pantometer ==
Kircher had mentioned the pantometer in his Specula Melitensis Encyclica noting that it was designed to help the Knights Hospitaller to solve "the most important mathematical and physical problems." It was a surveying tool that resembled a draughts board and could be used to calculate distances, weights and dimensions. In Magnes sive de Arte Magnetica (1643) Kircher has described an "Instrumentum, Pantometrum, Ichnographicum Magneticum" which allowed all things to be measured. It was 'magnetic' because it incorporated a compass, and 'ichnographic' because it could be used in map-making.

According to Schott, Kircher had first conceived of it in the company of father Ziegler, perhaps as early as 1623. Schott has been with Kircher in 1631 when he had first assembled the instrument and named it the 'pantometrum', sending an early example to Holy Roman Emperor Frederick III. Kircher had certainly used the pantometer himself to take scientific measurements when he was lowered into the crater of Vesuvius in 1638.

== Later editions and references ==
Pantometrum Kircherianum was reprinted by Cholinus in Frankfurt in 1668 and again in 1669. The work was referenced in books by a number of later writers, including Jacob Leupold's Theatrum Arithmetico-Geometricum (1727) and Christian Wolff's Mathematisches Lexikon (1747).

== See also ==
- Graphometer
