= A History of Science, Technology, and Philosophy in the 16th and 17th Centuries =

1935 book by Abraham Wolf

- Cover of Volume II
- Author: Abraham Wolf
- Language: English
- Subject: History of science
- Publisher: George Allen and Unwin
- Publication date: 1935
- Media type: Print

A History of Science, Technology, and Philosophy in the 16th and 17th Centuries is a book by Abraham Wolf first published in 1935 by George Allen and Unwin. A survey of the history of science in the sixteenth and seventeenth centuries, it received a mixed critical reception.

== Background and summary ==
Written by Abraham Wolf with the assistance of University College London astronomer Angus Armitage and University of Bonn professor Friedrich Dannemann, the book was first published in London in 1935 by George Allen and Unwin. A second edition, with minor revisions to the bibliography by Douglas McKie, was published in 1950, following Wolf's death. Dedicated to Master of Science students at University College London, where Wolf lectured, the book comprises twenty-six chapters, with a particular focus on the physical sciences (including astronomy, physics, chemistry, geology, and meteorology) and mathematics, as well as the positive relationship between modern science and technology. A companion history, titled A History of Science, Technology, and Philosophy in the 18th Century, was published in 1938.

== Reception ==
The book received mixed reviews from critics. Herbert Blumer commended Wolf for writing "a very notable contribution to the history of science." The British Journal for the Philosophy of Science contributor A. C. Crombie described A History of Science as "an invaluable source of information", while C. W. G. of The Mathematical Gazette admitted to being "impressed by the wide reading and profound erudition of the author." In Nature, W. C. D. Dampier concluded: "Prof. Wolf is to be congratulated on a volume, which, if not perfect, is yet a notable achievement." Dampier also commented in Philosophy that the book was "satisfactory". Journal of Chemical Education reviewer Tenney L. Davis praised the book for being "a good all-round treatment of its subject" that was "easy and interesting to read", but added that a "student of the history of chemistry or sociology, or any one of the special sciences, will probably find that it contains little or nothing on his subject which is new to him."

Journal of the History of Ideas reviewer I. Bernard Cohen observed that Wolf failed to establish a clear link between science and philosophy. In a review for The American Historical Review, Bert James Loewenberg lamented, "Professor Wolf has given us merely another history of science." J. D. Bernal dismissed Wolf's work as "not history" because it did not "instruct the scientific worker about the position and function of science within the larger whole." Henry E. Sigerist likewise argued in Science that "Professor Wolf's book is not a history of science but a collection of brief essays on the history of various scientific disciplines". He also wrote that he felt "disappointed" and "depressed" after reading the book. Isis reviewer George Sarton similarly stated that he was "bitterly disappointed". On the other hand, Alfred Romer opined in the American Journal of Physics: "Disappointment is an ungrateful emotion. This is not by any means a bad book. It was an enormous task to write it, and an all-but-impossible task to do it better. Though we could wish for more, this much at least we have."
