= Gaspar Schott =

German scientist

Gaspar Schott (German: Kaspar (or Caspar) Schott; Latin: Gaspar Schottus; 5 February 1608 – 22 May 1666) was a German Jesuit and scientist, specializing in the fields of physics, mathematics and natural philosophy, and known for his industry.

== Biography ==
He was born at Bad Königshofen im Grabfeld. It is probable, but not certain, that his early education was at the Jesuit College at Würzburg. In any case, at the age of 19 he joined the Society of Jesus, entering the novitiate at Trier on 30 October 1627. After two years of novitiate training, he matriculated at the University of Würzburg on 6 November 1629 to begin a three-year study of Philosophy, following the normal academic path prescribed for Jesuit seminarians. Owing to the Swedish invasion of Würzburg in October 1631, the Jesuit community fled the city. Schott went, first to the Jesuit seminary of Tournai in Belgium, and subsequently, in 1633, to Caltagirone in Sicily, where he continued his study of Theology. After two years at Caltagirone, he was transferred to Palermo for his final year study of Theology after which, in 1637, he was ordained a priest. For the next fifteen years he held a range of teaching and pastoral positions in various Jesuit colleges in Sicily. In 1652, following correspondence with his old mathematics teacher at Würzburg, Athanasius Kircher, now an internationally acclaimed scholar at the Collegio Romano, Schott was transferred to the Collegio to work as Kircher's assistant. He was to spend the next two and a half years assisting Kircher, but also assembling material of his own for which he would later seek a publisher.

In 1655 Schott returned to Germany, first to Mainz, and later the same year to Würzburg where he was to remain until his death. His return to Germany appears to have been partly motivated by the desire of his Jesuit superiors to mollify the Archbishop-Elector of Mainz, Johann von Schönborn, with whom relations had been strained.

== Works ==
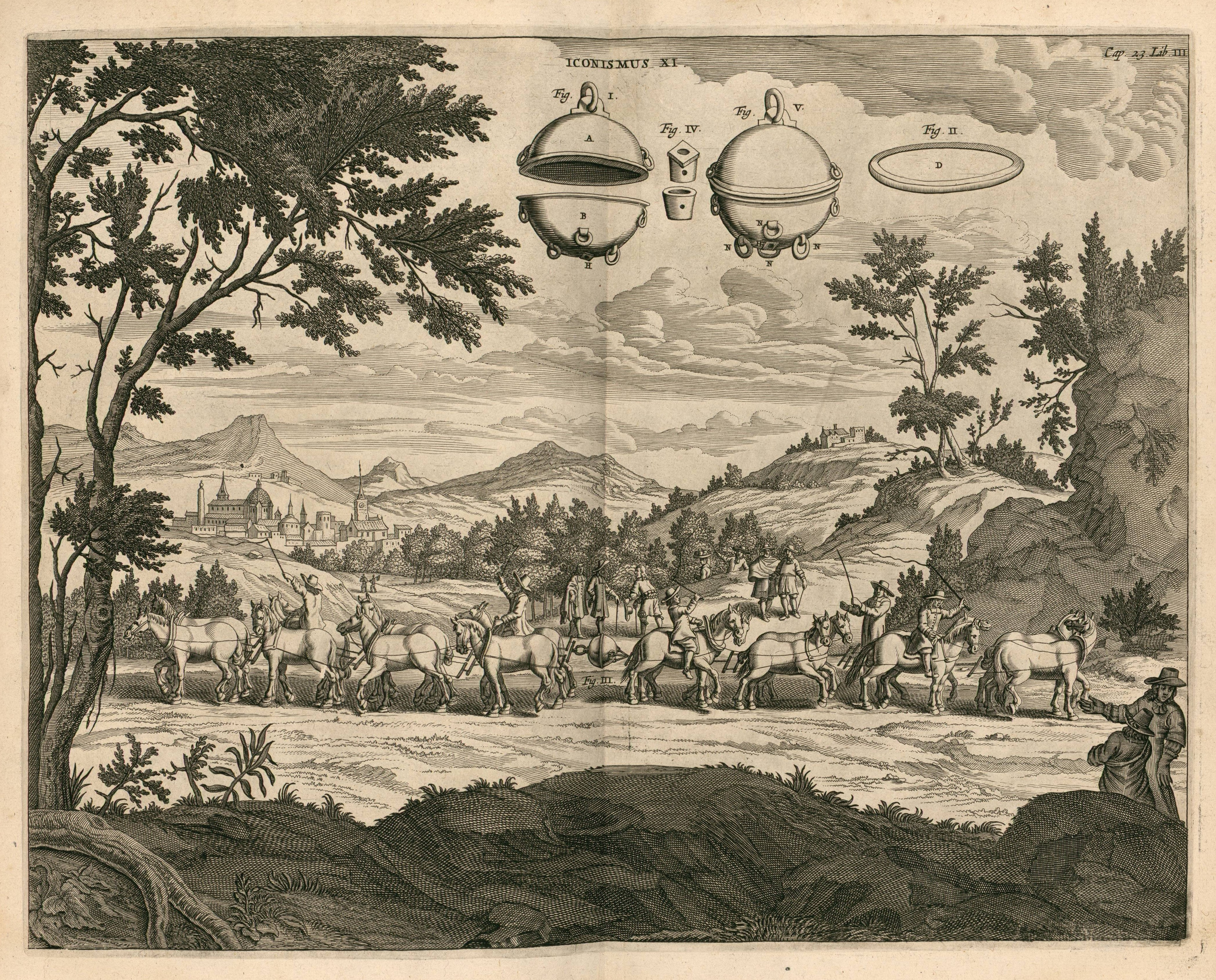
Gaspar Schott's sketch of Otto von Guericke's Magdeburg hemispheres experiment.

Schott was the author of numerous works from the fields of mathematics, physics, and magic. However, those works were mostly compilations of reports, articles or books he read and his own repeated experiments; he did little, if any, original research.

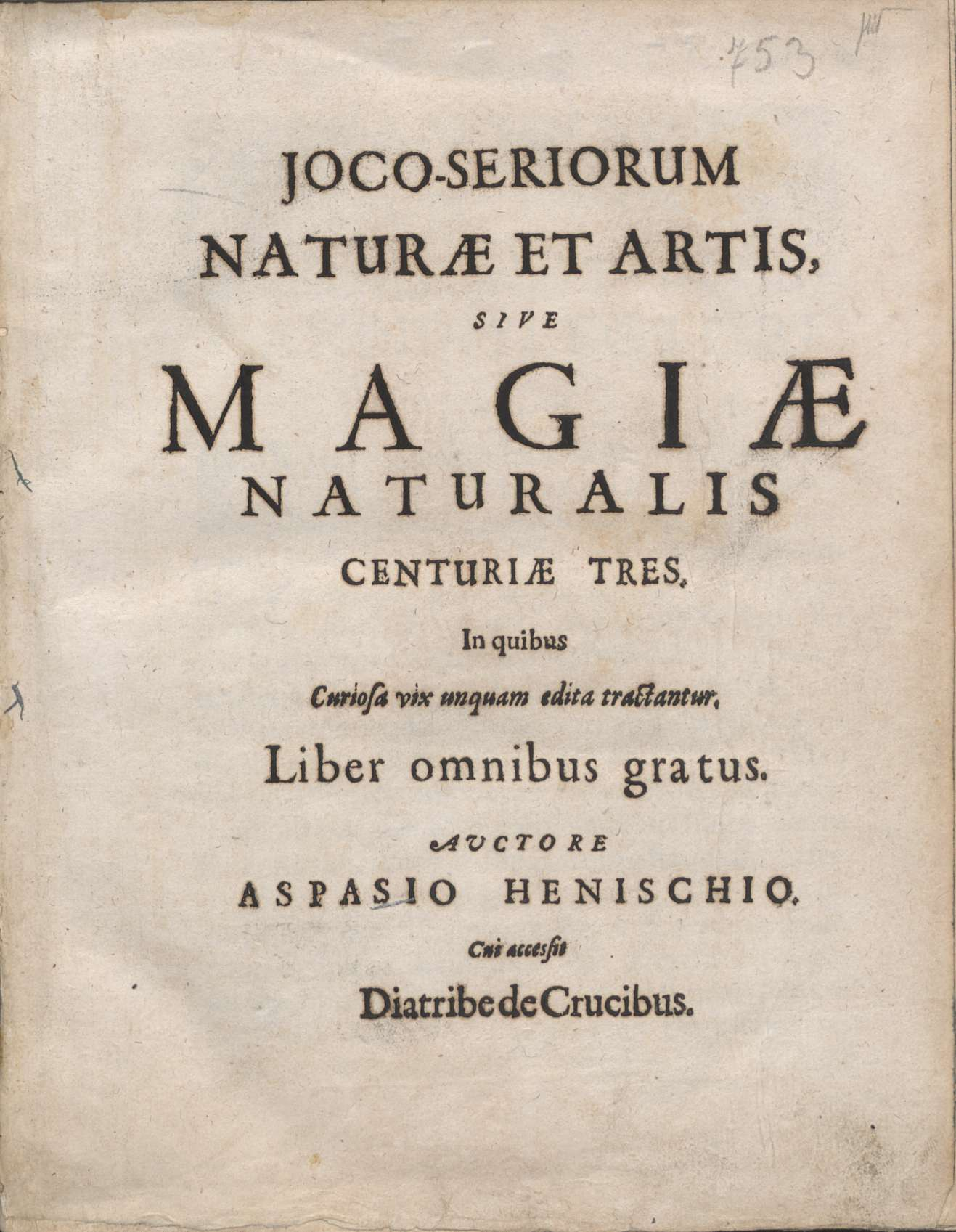
Joco-seriorum naturae et artis, 1666

Schott is most widely known for his works on hydraulic and mechanical instruments. His treatise on "chronometric marvels" is the first work describing a universal joint and providing the classification of gear teeth.

Among his most famous works is the book Magia universalis naturæ et artis (4 vols., Würtzburg, 1657–1659), filled with many mathematical problems and physical experiments, mostly from the areas of optics and acoustics. His Mechanica hydraulica-pneumatica (Würtzburg, 1657) contains the first description of von Guericke's air pump. He also published Pantometrum Kircherianum (Würtzburg, 1660); Physica curiosa (Würtzburg, 1662), a supplement to the Magia universalis; Anatomia physico-hydrostatica fontium et fluminum (Würtzburg, 1663), Technica Curiosa (1664), "Organum Mathematicum" (1668) and several editions of a Cursus mathematicus. He was also the editor of the Itinerarium extaticum of Athanasius Kircher and the Amussis Ferdinandea of Albert Curtz.

- Mechanica hydraulico-pneumatica (in Latin). Frankfurt am Main: Johann Gottfried Schönwetter. 1657.
- Anatomia physico-hydrostatica fontium ac fluminum (in Latin). Würzburg: Johann Gottfried Schönwetter, Witwe. 1663.
- Technica curiosa (in Latin). Vol. 1. Nürnberg: Johann Andreas Endter & Wolfgang Endter (2.), Erben. 1664.
- Technica curiosa (in Latin). Vol. 2. Nürnberg: Johann Andreas Endter & Wolfgang Endter (2.), Erben. 1664.
- Joco-seriorum naturae et artis (in Latin). Würzburg. 1666.

== In fiction ==
Gaspar Schott served as an inspiration for the creation of Gaspar Wanderdrossel, one of the main characters of Umberto Eco's novel The Island of the Day Before.

== See also ==
- List of Jesuit scientists
- List of Roman Catholic scientist-clerics
