= Magdeburg hemispheres =

Pair of copper hemispheres designed to demonstrate the power of atmospheric pressure

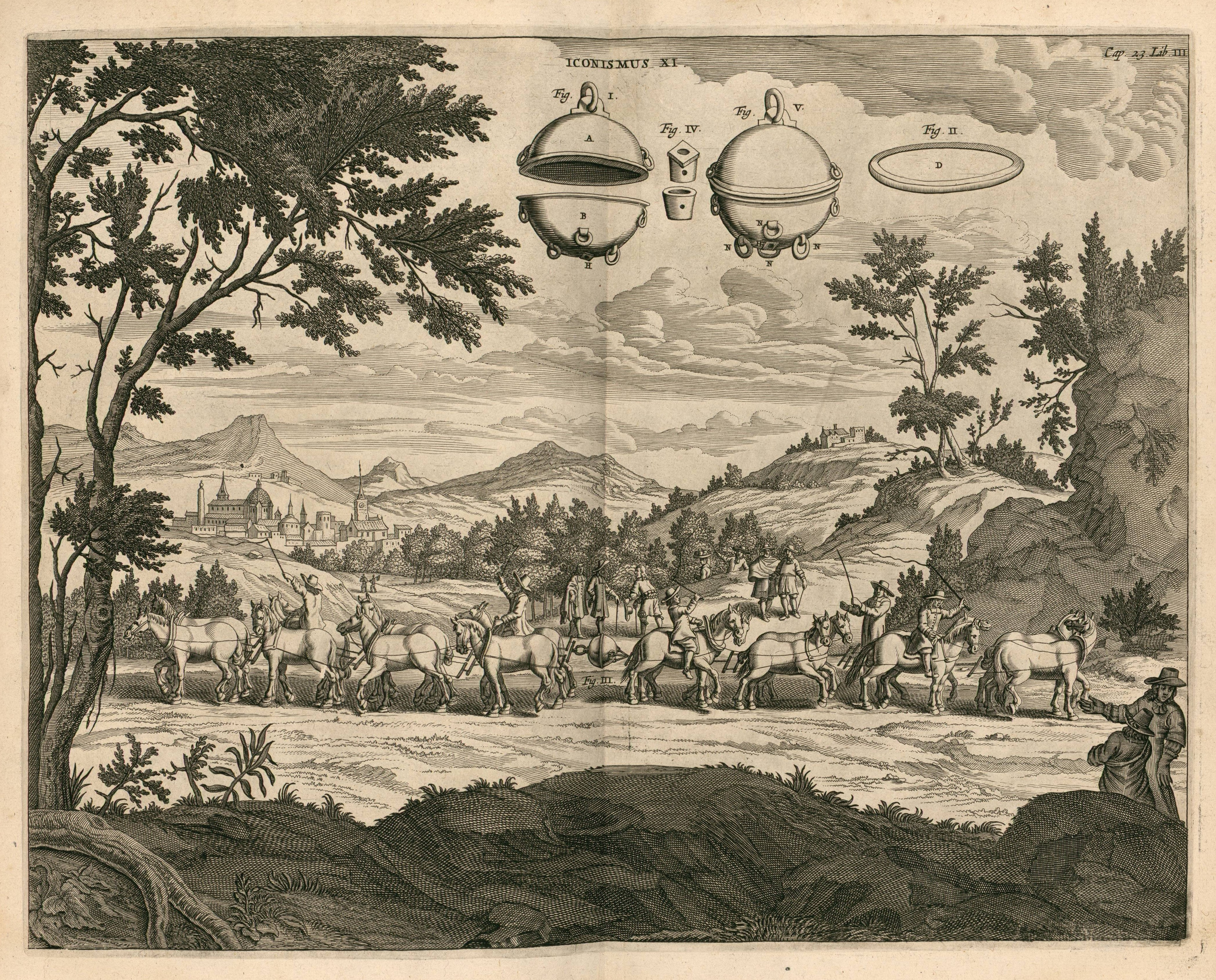
Gaspar Schott's sketch of Otto von Guericke's Magdeburg hemispheres experiment

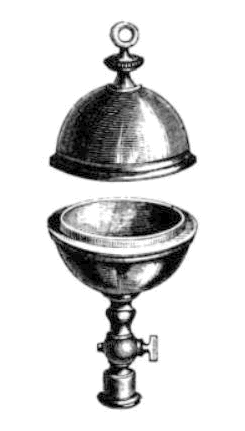
Small 4 in. hemispheres used in science education, 1870s

The Magdeburg hemispheres are a pair of large copper hemispheres with mating rims that were used in a famous 1654 experiment to demonstrate the power of atmospheric pressure. When the rims were sealed with grease and the air was pumped out, the sphere contained a vacuum and could not be pulled apart by teams of horses. Once the valve was opened, air rushed in and the hemispheres were easily separated. The Magdeburg hemispheres were invented by German scientist and mayor of Magdeburg, Otto von Guericke, to demonstrate the air pump that he had invented and the concept of atmospheric pressure.

Speculation varied about the contents of the sphere. Many thought it was simply empty, while others argued the vacuum contained air or some finer aerial substance. Sound did not transmit through the sphere, indicating that sound needed a medium in order to travel and/or be sensed, while light did not.

The first artificial vacuum had been produced a few years earlier by Evangelista Torricelli and inspired Guericke to design the world's first vacuum pump, which consisted of a piston and cylinder with one-way flap valves. The hemispheres became popular in physics lectures as an illustration of the strength of air pressure, and are still used in education. The original hemispheres are on display in the Deutsches Museum in Munich.

Aside from its scientific importance, the experiment served to prove the recovery of the city of Magdeburg, which only two decades earlier had undergone the Sack of Magdeburg – considered the worst atrocity of the Thirty Years' War – when 20,000 of its inhabitants were massacred, and only 4,000 remained at the end of the war in 1648. Von Guericke was concerned with both aspects of the experiment, in his double capacity as a leading scientist and as the mayor who worked tirelessly to restore the city's wealth.

== Overview ==
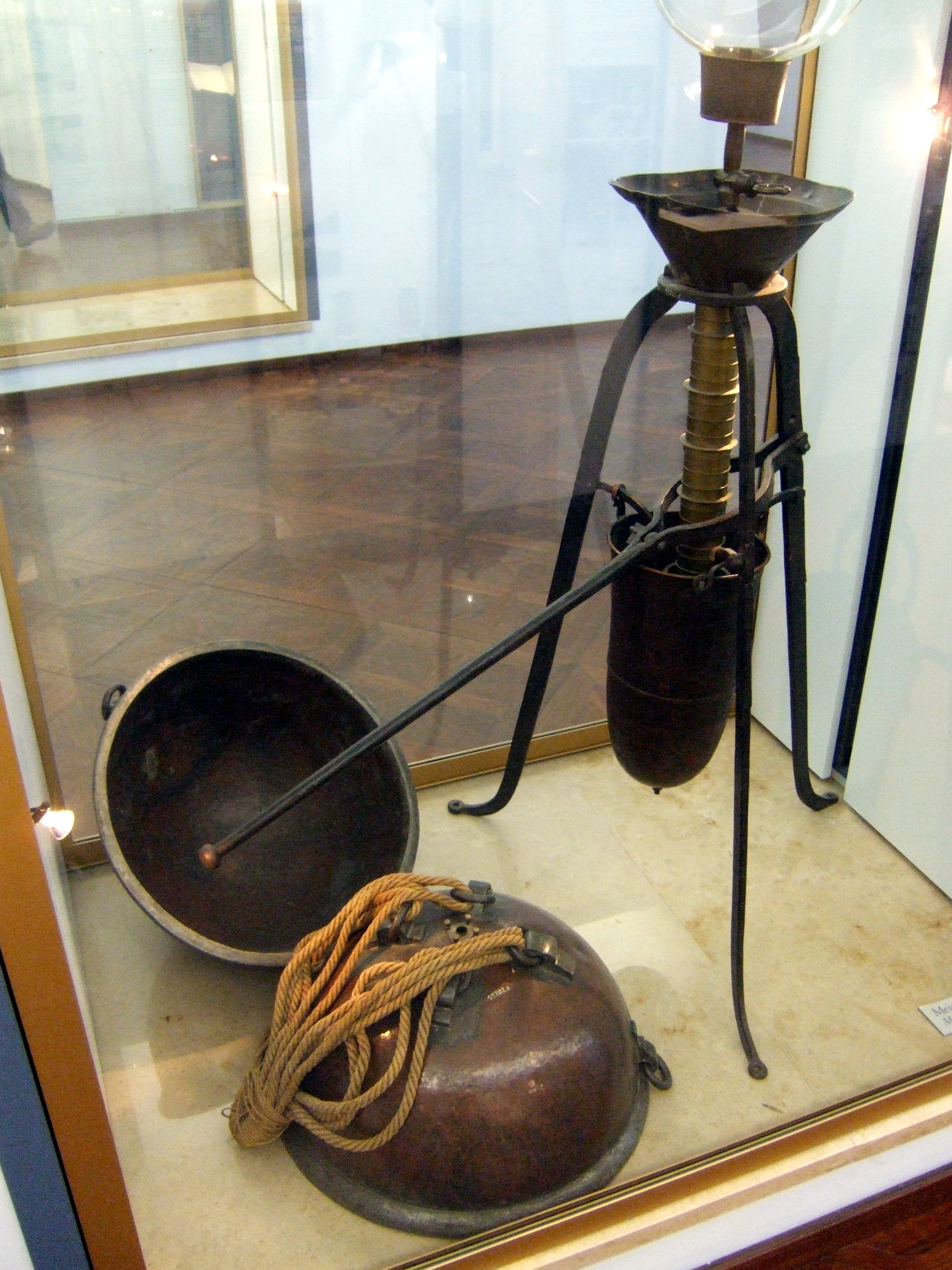
The original Magdeburg hemispheres and Guericke's vacuum pump in the Deutsches Museum, Munich, Germany

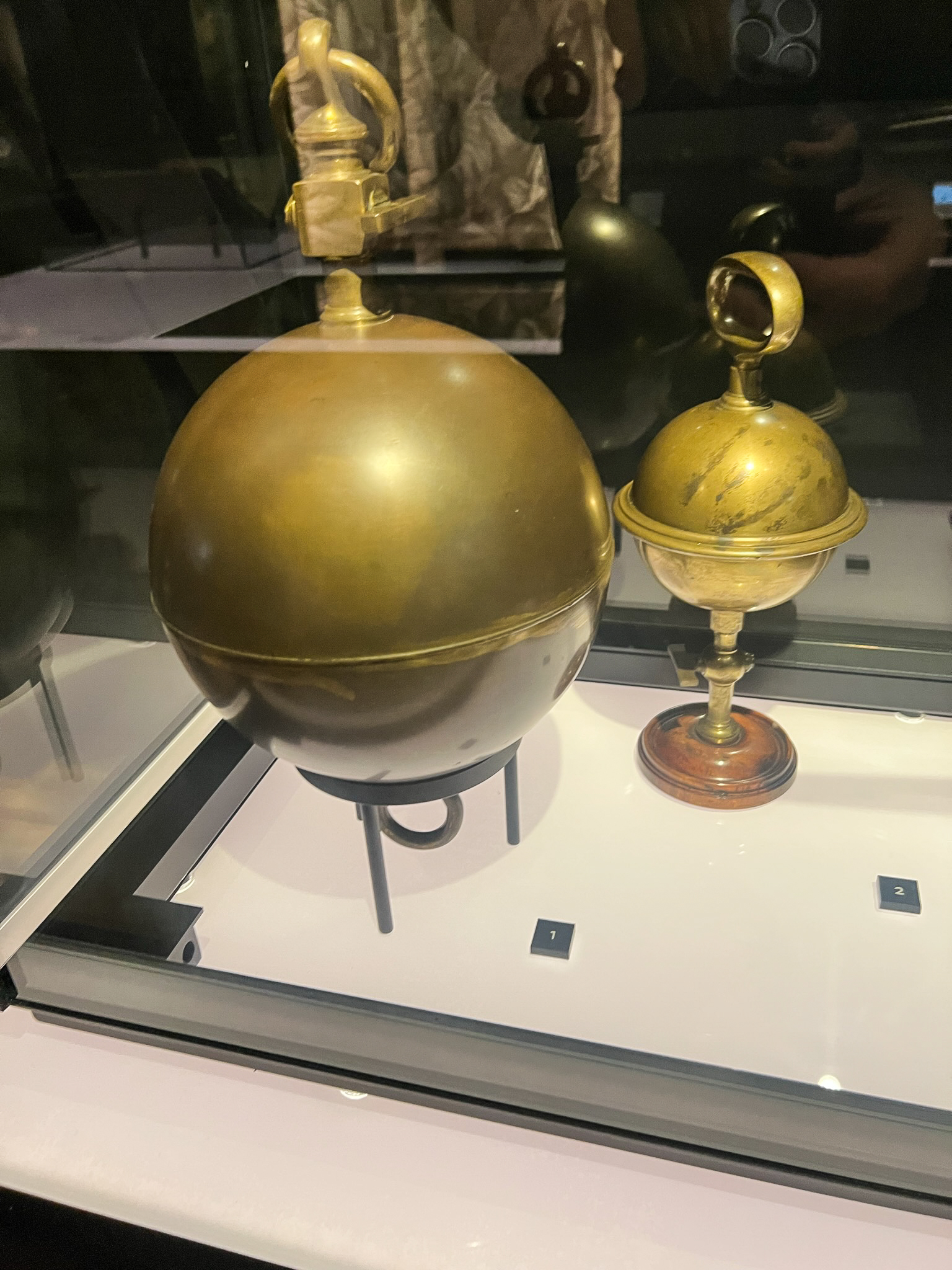
1680 and 1720 Magdeburg hemispheres at the Rijksmuseum Boerhaave

The Magdeburg hemispheres, around 50 cm (20 inches) in diameter, were designed to demonstrate the vacuum pump that Guericke had invented. One of them had a tube connection to attach the pump, with a valve to close it off. When the air was sucked out from inside the hemispheres, and the valve was closed, the hose from the pump could be detached, and they were held firmly together by the air pressure of the surrounding atmosphere.

The force holding the hemispheres together was equal to the area bounded by the joint between the hemispheres, a circle with a diameter of 50 cm, multiplied by the difference in air pressure between the inside and the outside. It is unclear how strong a vacuum Guericke's pump was able to achieve, but if it was able to evacuate all of the air from the inside, the hemispheres would have been held together with a force of around 20 kilonewtons (4,500 lbf; 2.2 short tons-force), equivalent to lifting a car or small elephant; a dramatic demonstration of the pressure of the atmosphere.

== Demonstrations ==
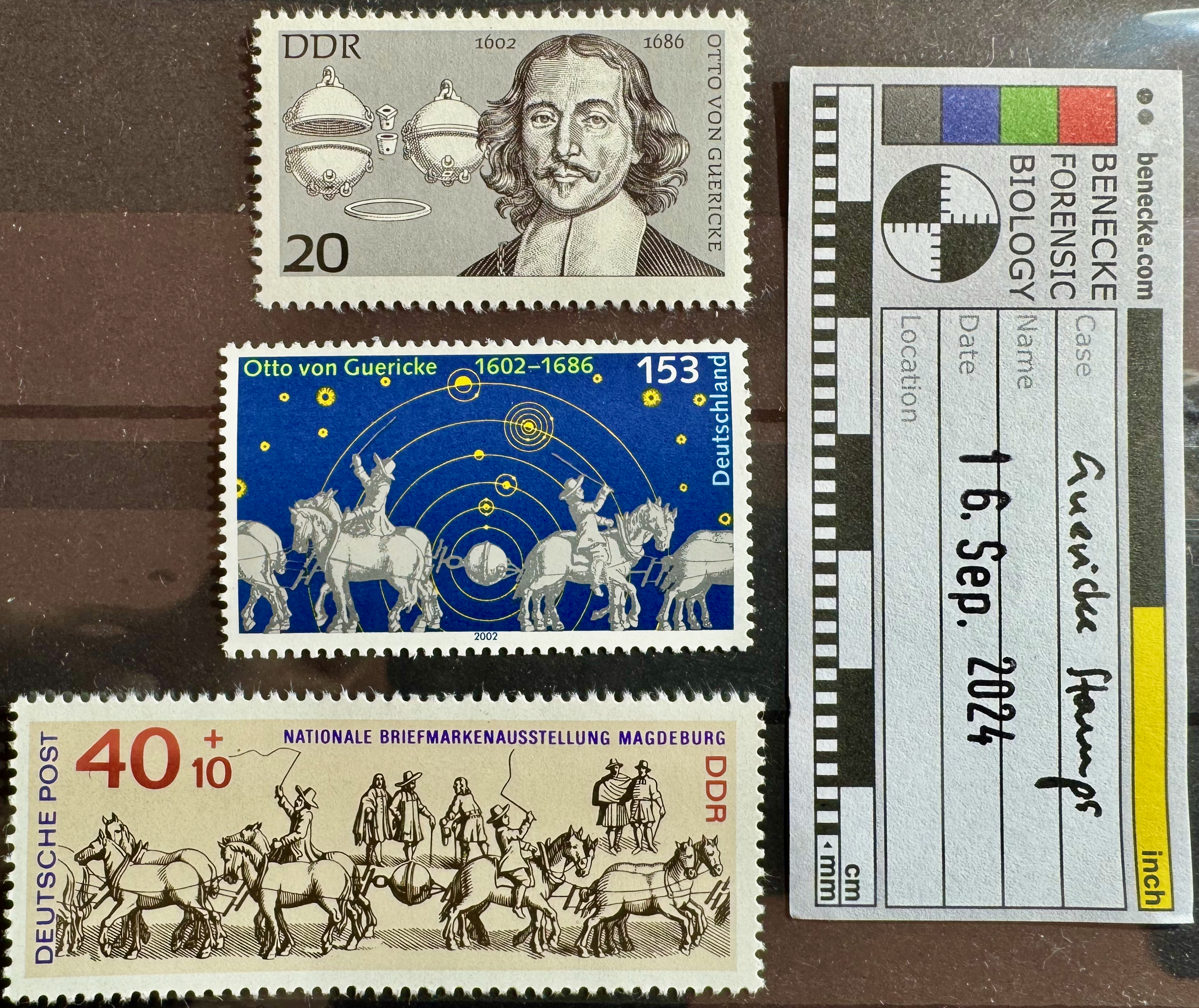
Stamps celebrating the display and test of the vacuum hemispheres of Otto von Guericke in Magdeburg, Germany

Guericke's demonstration was performed on 8 May 1654 in front of the Imperial Diet, and the Emperor Ferdinand III in Regensburg. Thirty horses, in two teams of fifteen, could not separate the hemispheres until the valve was opened to equalize the air pressure. In 1656 he repeated the demonstration with sixteen horses (two teams of eight) in his hometown of Magdeburg, where he was mayor. He also took the two spheres, hung the two hemispheres with a support, and removed the air from within. He then strapped weights to the spheres, but the spheres would not budge. Gaspar Schott was the first to describe the experiment in print in his Mechanica Hydraulico-Pneumatica (1657). In 1663 the same demonstration was given in Berlin before Frederick William, Elector of Brandenburg with twenty-four horses.

The experiment became a popular way to illustrate the principles of air pressure, and many smaller copies of the hemispheres were made, and are used to this day in science classes. Reenactments of von Guericke's experiment of 1654 are performed in locations around the world by the Otto von Guericke Society. On 18 March 2000, a demonstration using sixteen horses was conducted in Great Torrington by Barometer World.

A small pair of hemispheres is shown in the painting "An Experiment on a bird in the Airpump" by Joseph Wright of Derby, currently on display in the National Gallery in London.

The experiment has been commemorated on three German stamps.

After learning about Guericke's pump through Schott's book, Robert Boyle worked with Robert Hooke to design and build an improved air pump. From this, through various experiments, they formulated what is called Boyle's law, which states that the volume of a body of an ideal gas is inversely proportional to its pressure. Much later the ideal gas law was formulated in 1834.

== See also ==
- Horror vacui (physics)
