= Barometer World =

Museum in Devon, England

Coordinates: 50.8911°N 4.0923°W

Barometer World was the world's only barometer museum, and was located in the village of Merton, near Great Torrington, Devon, England. Barometer World makes, sells and restores barometers of a variety of types. It was established in 1979 by Philip Collins. In March 2022, Barometer World closed its museum and premises in Merton, Devon. It is now an online-only business.

== History ==
In 1987 Barometer World moved from The Old Smithy in Merton to its current location at Quicksilver Barn. An exhibition of barometers was opened by Peter Negretti in 1990 and replaced by a new one now on display, the current premises comprises a shop, workshop, and the exhibition. Visitors are advised to e-mail or phone before turning up.

The museum's curator is Philip Collins. He started learning the craft of barometer repair in Bideford at the age of 19, and in 1979 established a barometer specialist company. He is an author of barometer books having written numerous books on barometers and restoration techniques. Mr Collins is the secretary of the British Barometer Makers Association and was a Fellow of the Royal Meteorological Society.

== Exhibition ==
The museum's main exhibition was a small display of different types of barometers and other weather forecasting items from examples of primitive weather indicators, a snorting barometer, a mining barometer, Fitzroy barometers and others to oddities such as a shark oil predictor and weather houses. The museum houses a full size replica of Merryweather's Tempest Prognosticator which was shown at the Great Exhibition in 1851. It is a fully workable copy, although the museum rarely operates it on a regular basis.

Between 1995 and 2005 Barometer World housed the Banfield Family Collection of barometers. The exhibition was of 350 barometers, mostly owned by Edwin Banfield, which were loaned to Barometer World for a 10-year period. The collection has subsequently been separated and sold.

For National Science Week 2000, Barometer World reconstructed Magdeburg Hemispheres in a demonstration on Great Torrington common. The demonstration used 16 shire horses and 24-inch-diameter hemispheres. On rare occasions Barometer World have staged special displays of the power of the atmosphere with a model of Brunel's 'atmospheric railway' tug of air and weighing the atmosphere.

== Workshop ==
The museum has an on-site workshop where barometers can be made or repaired. However, since October 2009 the EU regulations resulting in the ban on using mercury, no new mercury barometers can be placed on the market. This has resulted in the workshop reducing its output, customers need to contact them before bringing any item.

A replica glass kiln was made in 2001 as an experiment in 17th century glass production methods, it has since been removed. The kiln was built to 17th century designs, with a double fire box and double drawing points. The structure is built of two walls of modern building bricks, the inner layer on top of a layer of firebricks. The gap between the layers is filled with vermiculite and the outside is coated with a layer of lime-based daub and painted. Temperatures achieved from wood firing only are around 1300 degrees Celsius (2400°F). Lead glass cullet from the nearby Dartington Crystal is generally used for experimenting when the kiln is fired.
