= Abraham Wolf =

British Professor of Philosophy

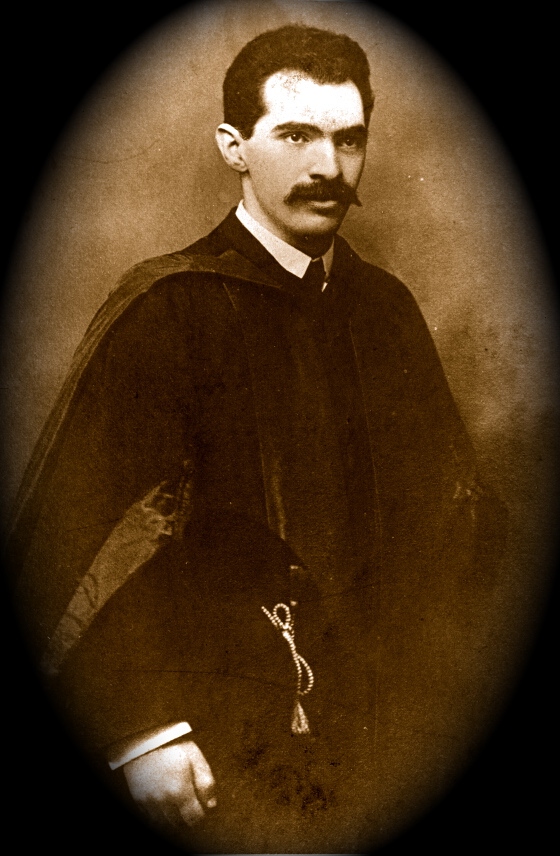
Abraham Wolf (c. 1903)

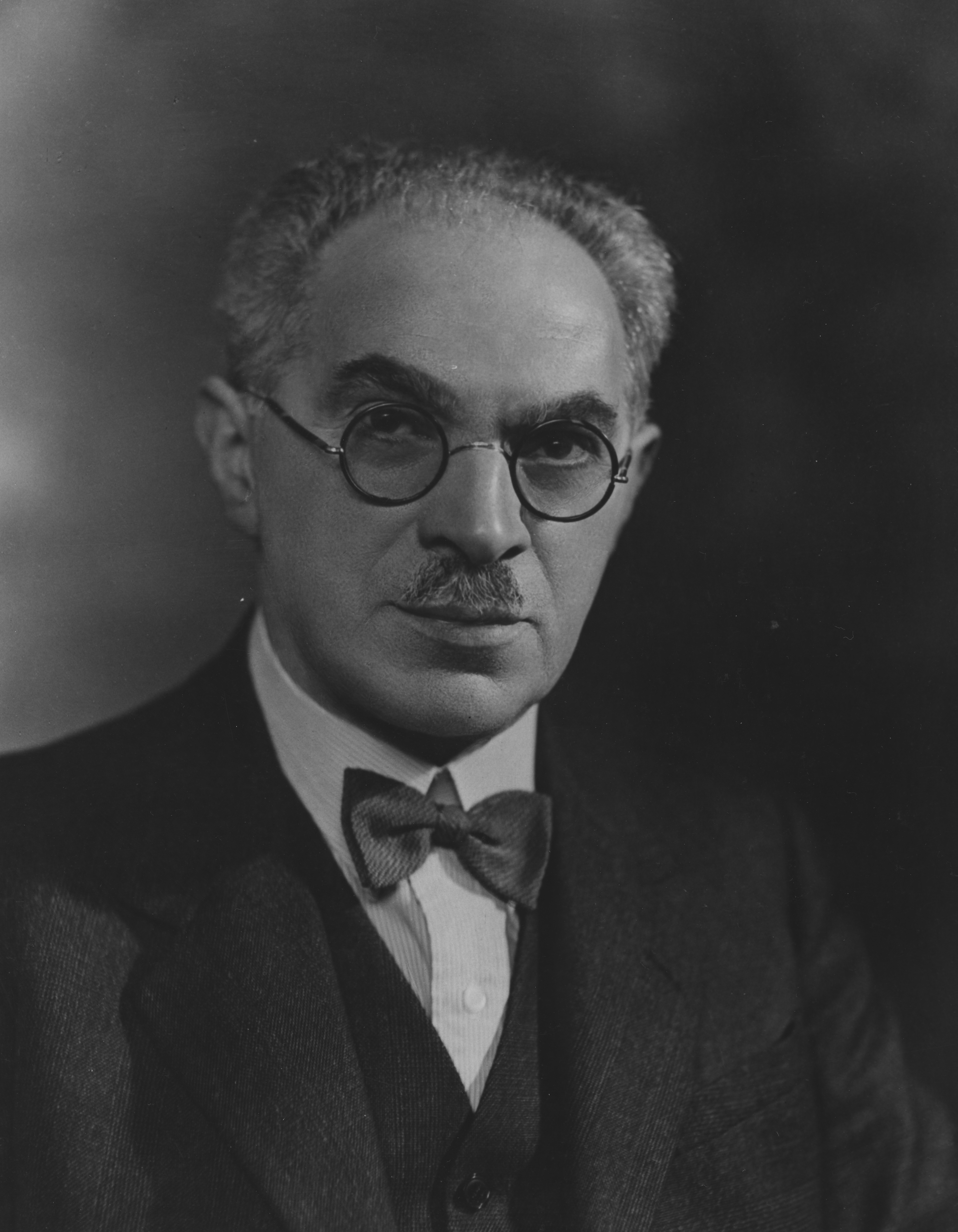
Abraham Wolf (c. 1930s)

Abraham Wolf (1876 – 19 May 1948) was a Russian-born English historian, philosopher, writer, and rabbi.

== Life ==
Born to a shopkeeper and his wife, Wolf simultaneously studied mental and moral philosophy at the University of London and Semitic studies at the Jews' College. He later attended St John's College on a Jews' College scholarship and his dissertation was published by Cambridge University Press in 1905.

Wolf is credited with introducing the history of science to University College London, where he lectured as Professor of Logic and Scientific Method from 1920 to 1941. Wolf was a scientific rationalist who embraced ideas held by Baruch Spinoza—many of whose works Wolf translated into English—and Maimonides. Wolf's 1915 collection of lectures on Friedrich Nietzsche was "one of the earliest English discussions of the thinker".

Wolf was the co-editor of the 14th edition of the Encyclopædia Britannica, published in 1929. Two volumes of his A History of Science, Technology, and Philosophy in the 16th and 17th Centuries, written with the assistance of University College astronomer Angus Armitage, were published in 1935; two further volumes, A History of Science, Technology, and Philosophy in the 18th Century, were published two years later. He was also a rabbi at the Manchester Reform Synagogue and a frequent contributor to the Jewish Quarterly Review. However, he would experience a tension between his beliefs in Reform Judaism and science, and he eventually resigned from the rabbinate in 1907. By 1933, Wolf had ceased to write anything noteworthy on Judaism, having devoted himself to philosophy and secular scholarship.

From 1942 until his death in 1948, he was an honorary associate of the Rationalist Press Association. In 1950, Wolf's private collection of books by and about Spinoza—which took forty-five years to amass and was then the largest collection of its kind in the world—was transferred to UCLA.

== Works ==
- Wolf, A. (1905). The existential import of categorical predication : studies in logic. Cambridge: University Press.
- Wolf, A. (1915). The philosophy of Nietzsche. London: Constable & Co.
- Wolf, A. (1919). Exercises in logic and scientific method. London: G. Allen & Unwin ltd.
- Wolf, A. (1928). Essentials of scientific method. London: G. Allen & Wunwin.
- Wolf, A. (1930). Textbook of logic. London: G. Allen & Unwin, ltd.
- Wolf, A. (1945). Higher education in German-occupied countries. London: Methuen & Co. Ltd.
- Wolf, A. (1950). Spinoza (1632-1677) : the library of the late Prof. Dr. A. Wolf. Amsterdam: Internationaal Antiquariaat.
