= Frederick Edward Brasch =

American astronomer (1875 – 1967)

Frederick Edward Brasch (December 18, 1875 – October 26, 1967) was an American astronomer, reference librarian, bibliographer, and historian of science. He is noteworthy for his work on the history of astronomy from Isaac Newton onward.

== Biography ==
Brasch studied at Stanford University from 1897 to 1899 and at the University of California from 1899 to 1901. From 1901 to 1902 he held a temporary job as a bookbinder at Stanford University Press. In 1902 he began working in an unpaid position at Harvard College Observatory. There from 1903 to 1904 he was paid as an assistant observer. On August 5, 1903, he married Winnifred E. Orpin. In 1905 he became employed in performing mathematical calculations at Lick Observatory. From 1912 to 1916 he was an assistant at the Stanford University Libraries. In 1915 he was elected a Fellow of the American Association for the Advancement of Science. In 1916 he studied at Harvard College. He was from 1917 to 1921 an assistant reference librarian at John Crerar Library in Chicago and from 1921 to 1922 a reference librarian at James Jerome Hill Reference Library in St. Paul, Minnesota. Branch did bibliographic research from 1922 to 1923 for the National Research Council and worked as a librarian from 1923 to 1924 in the Carnegie Institution's Department of Terrestrial Magnetism. He served as the secretary of the history of science section of the AAAS and during the 1920s was also secretary of the Isaac Newton commemoration. At the New York Academy of Medicine in a symposium held on the 28th & 29 December 1929, Brasch gave a lecture entitled Medical men in mathematics, astronomy and physics. From 1925 to 1943 he was the Chief of Scientific Collections at the Library of Congress. After retiring from the Library of Congress, he worked for Stanford University from 1944 to 1948 as a consultant in the history of science and from 1948 to 1967 as a consultant in bibliography.

In 1941 Brasch donated to Stanford University his entire collection of books and manuscripts relating to Isaac Newton and the physical sciences in the 1600s and early 1700s. There are more than 4,000 volumes in the collection, which includes several editions of Newton's Philosophiæ Naturalis Principia Mathematica and five books actually owned by Newton.

Frederick E. Brasch was a member of the Unitarian Church and several scientific and historical societies. His wife Winnifred died in 1938. Upon his own death in 1967 he was survived by his daughter Carolyn Mildred (1909–2005) and his son Maxwell Frederick.

Henry E. Lowood wrote a 42-page biography of Frederick E. Brasch.

== Selected publications ==
- Brasch, Frederick E. (1915). "The History of Science". Science. 41 (1053): 358–360. doi:10.1126/science.41.1053.358.b.
- — (1915). "The Teaching of the History of Science". Science. 42 (1091): 746–760. Bibcode:1915Sci....42..746B. doi:10.1126/science.42.1091.746. PMID 17829108.
- — (1916). "John Winthrop (1714-1779), America's First Astronomer, and the Science of His Period". Publications of the Astronomical Society of the Pacific. 28 (165): 153. Bibcode:1916PASP...28..153B. doi:10.1086/122527. S2CID 122140060.
- — (1924). "Materials for the Biography of Contemporary Scientists (Chiefly Obituary Notices)". Isis. 6 (3): 460–474. doi:10.1086/358269. S2CID 144893339.
- — (1928). "John Winthrop, America's first astronomer and the first disciple of Sir Isaac Newton in the Colonies". Popular Astronomy. 36: 83. Bibcode:1928PA.....36...83B.
- — (1929). "Einstein's Appreciation of Simon Newcomb". Science. 69 (1783): 248–249. doi:10.1126/science.69.1783.248.c. PMID 17730196. S2CID 239492610.
- — (1931). "The Royal Society of London and Its Influence Upon Scientific Thought in the American Colonies". The Scientific Monthly. 33 (5): 448–469. Bibcode:1931SciMo..33..448B. JSTOR 15250.
- — (1931). "The Royal Society of London and Its Influence Upon Scientific Thought in the American Colonies". The Scientific Monthly. 33 (5): 448–469. Bibcode:1931SciMo..33..448B. JSTOR 15250.
- — (October 1939). "The Newtonian Epoch in the American Colonies (1680–1783)" (PDF). Proceedings of the American Antiquarian Society: 314–332.
- — (1943). "Thomas Jefferson, the Scientist". Science. 97 (2518): 300–301. Bibcode:1943Sci....97..300B. doi:10.1126/science.97.2518.300. PMID 17748092.
- — (1945). "Two Important Manuscripts by Albert Einstein". Quarterly Journal of Current Acquisitions. 2 (2): 39–48. JSTOR 29780374.
- — (1946). "History of Science". Quarterly Journal of Current Acquisitions. 3 (4): 38–40. JSTOR 29780439. 1946
- — (1946). "The First Edition of Copernicus' "De revolutionibus"". Quarterly Journal of Current Acquisitions. 3 (3): 19–22. JSTOR 29780425.
- — (1962). "The Isaac Newton Collection". Publications of the Astronomical Society of the Pacific. 74 (440): 366–391. Bibcode:1962PASP...74..366B. doi:10.1086/127828. JSTOR 40673892.
