= Otto von Guericke =

German scientist, inventor, and politician (1602–1686)

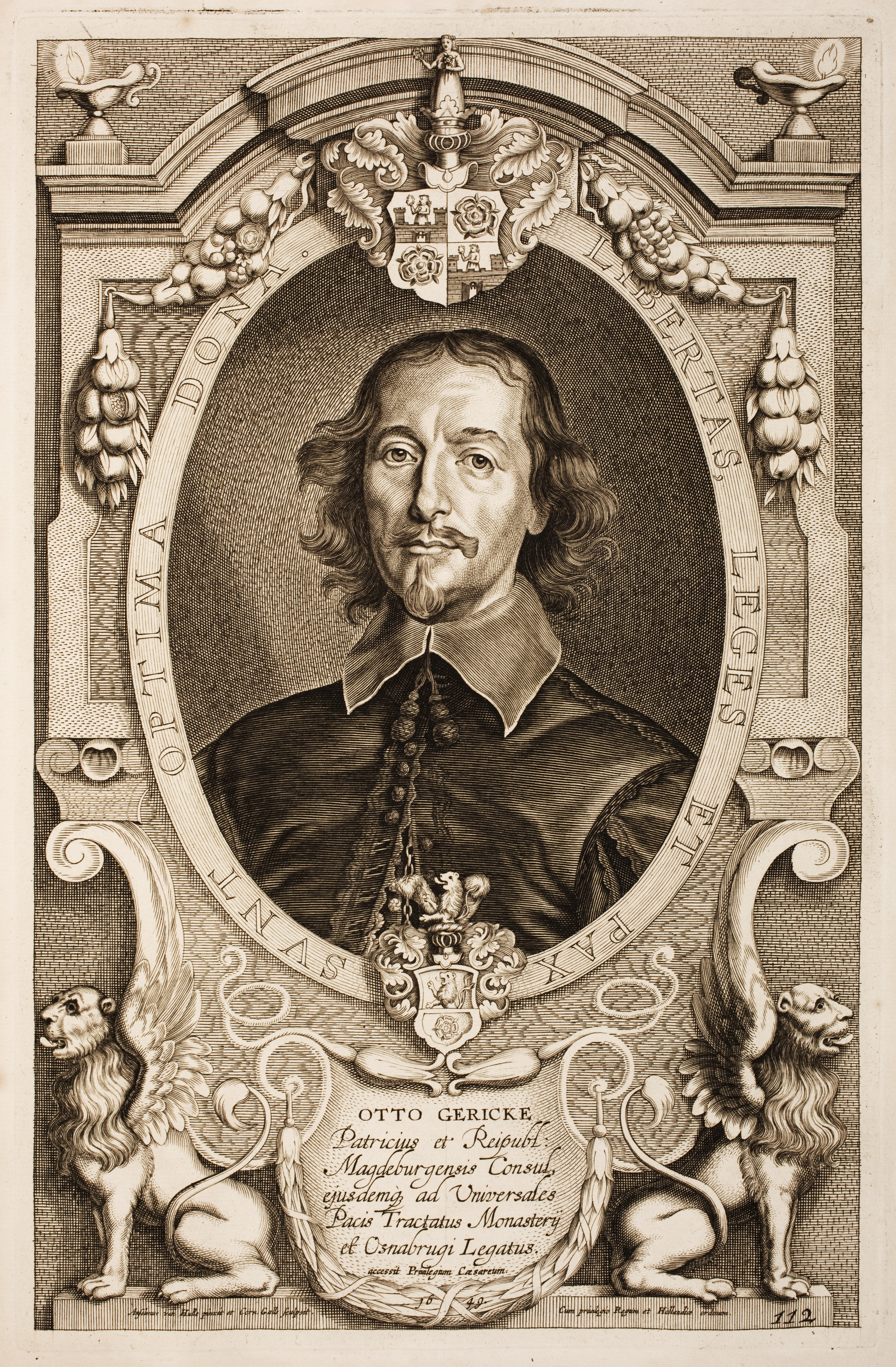
- Otto von Guericke, engraving after a portrait by Anselm van Hulle (1601–1674)
- Born: Otto Gericke; 30 November 1602; Magdeburg, Archbishopric of Magdeburg, Holy Roman Empire
- Died: 21 May 1686 (aged 83); Free and Hanseatic City of Hamburg, Holy Roman Empire
- Known for: Vacuum; Vacuum pump; Electrostatic generator; Magdeburg hemispheres; Anemoscope; Dasymeter
- Scientific career
- Fields: Physicist, politician

Otto von Guericke (UK: /ˈɡɛərɪkə/ GAIR-ik-ə, US: /ˈɡ(w)ɛərɪkə, -ki/ G(W)AIR-ik-ə, -ee; German: [ˈɔtoː fɔn ˈɡeːʁɪkə]; spelled Gericke until 1666; 30 November [O.S. 20 November] 1602 – 21 May [O.S. 11 May] 1686) was a German scientist, inventor, mathematician, and physicist. His pioneering scientific work, the development of experimental methods and repeatable demonstrations on the physics of the vacuum, atmospheric pressure, electrostatic repulsion, his advocacy for the reality of "action at a distance" and of "absolute space" were noteworthy contributions for the advancement of the Scientific Revolution.

== Biography ==
=== Early life and education ===
Otto von Guericke was born to a patrician family of Magdeburg. He was privately tutored until the age of fifteen. In 1617 he began studying law and philosophy at the Leipzig University. However, in 1620 his studies were disrupted by his father's death. He briefly returned home before continuing his studies at the Academia Julia in Helmstedt and the universities of Jena and Leiden. It was at Leiden that he first attended courses on mathematics, physics and military engineering. He concluded his academic education with a nine-month Grand Tour to France and England.

=== Family ===
Upon his return to Magdeburg in 1626 he married Margarethe Alemann, with whom he had three children (Anna Catherine, Hans Otto, and Jacob Christopher) before her untimely death in 1645. Anna Catherine and Jacob Christopher both died in infancy and in 1652 von Guericke married Dorothea Lentke.

=== Political career ===
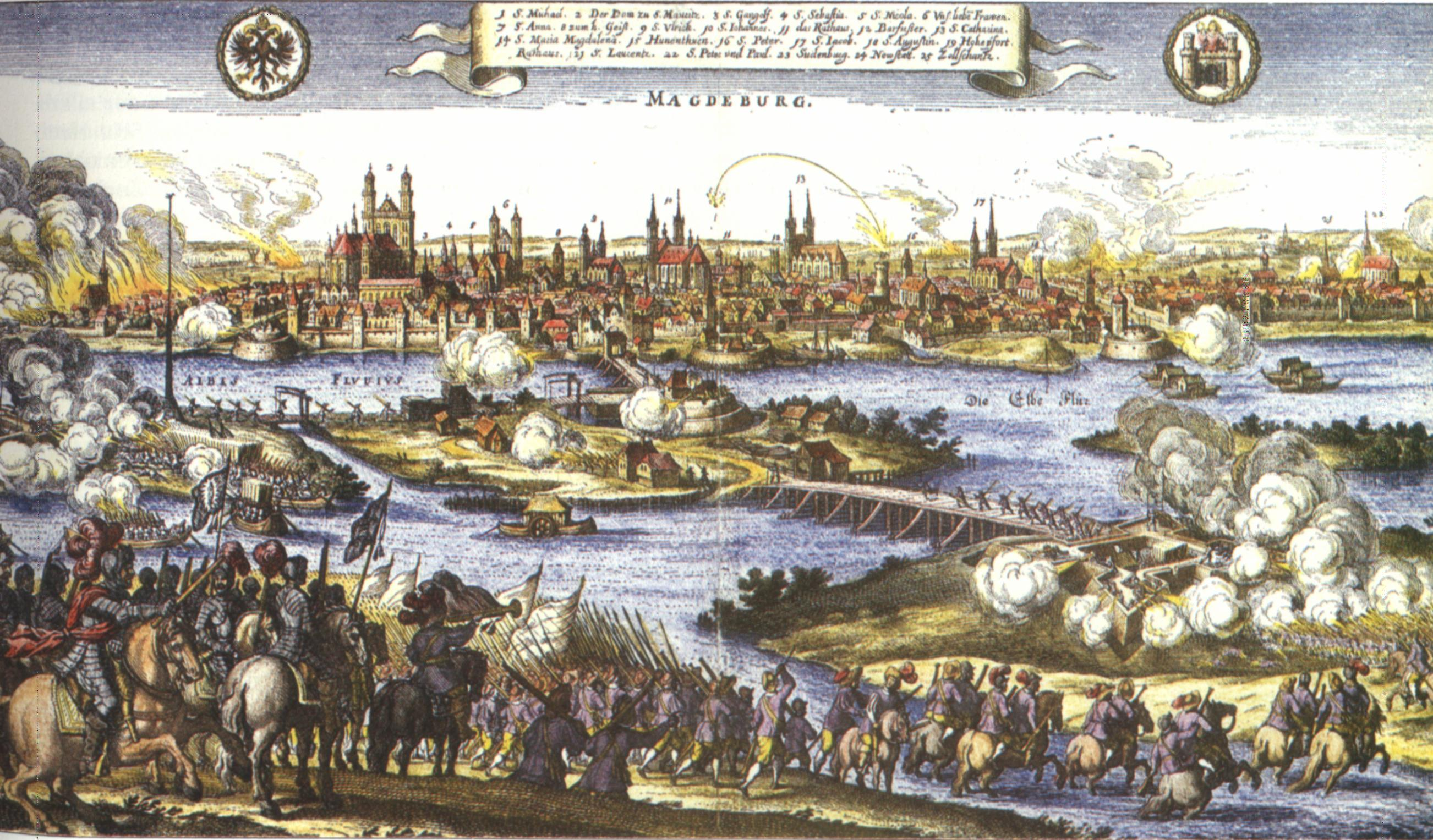
Sack of Magdeburg, imperial troops have conquered the toll redoubt and enter the suburbs, April 1631

Von Guericke was the offspring of one of Magdeburg's leading patrician families, that were well-educated and well-connected. His father and grandfather had been life-long members of the city council and at various occasions during their careers been appointed to serve as mayor of the city. In 1626, Otto von Guericke started his career as political representative of Magdeburg and accepted an official appointment to join the city council. However, in 1618, the Thirty Years' War had broken out. This exceptionally long, tragic and destructive conflict would soon also descend upon Magdeburg. Only a few years later, he had luckily fled from the city before an army of the imperial Catholic League, led by the Count of Tilly had completely surrounded and cut off Magdeburg. The attack culminated in the single most devastating event of the entire war, namely the Sack of Magdeburg. In May 1631, the imperial troops had crushed the city walls and indiscriminately plundered the riches. Around eighty percent of its more than 25,000 inhabitants perished. The material loss was also unusually high as widespread fires destroyed about 1,700 of a total of 1,900 buildings, including all of von Guericke's personal property. He returned to Magdeburg in 1631 and his academic engineer education designated him an appointee of the reconstruction committee.

He became a master brewer in an attempt to speedily acquire a new personal fortune and accumulate wealth for the city. In 1646, he was elected as Magdeburg's Burgomeister, the city's chief magistrate or executive, an office that arguably bestowed more power (in a practical sense) than that of a mayor. He held this position until his retirement in 1678. During four decades in office he undertook numerous diplomatic missions, which took him to many European courts and councils, where he met powerful executives and secretaries and addressed the illustrious elite of dukes, kings and emperors. In 1666, Otto von Guericke was ennobled by emperor Leopold I, which, apart from entitling him to add the "von" prefix to his name, was of little consequence. He also altered the spelling of his last name from "Gericke" to "Guericke".

=== Diplomatic pursuits ===
Otto von Guericke's first diplomatic mission on behalf of the city led him in September 1642 to the court of the Elector of Saxony at Dresden. Von Guericke's mandate was to bring about a more lenient treatment from the Saxon military commander for Magdeburg. In 1648, he represented the city at the peace treaty delegation, that ended the Thirty Year's War. During a 1654 diplomatic mission to Regensburg, Guericke presented his invention of the air-pump to impress those he was going to meet and help sway the talks in his favour, as well as promote his own scientific achievements. Diplomacy assignments, often dangerous as well as tedious, would occupy much of his time for the next twenty years. His private life, of which much remains unclear, was developing in parallel. Otto von Guericke utilised both his official status and his scientific knowledge in each other's support to serve his city's political agenda. Demonstrations of his inventions, such as the air-pump and the electrostatic generator were meant to impress his audiences and improve and extend political communication. He would, if necessary forgo scientific and technical elaborations on how his showpieces worked, leaving people to believe in his wizardry, a characteristic that was of great use for the promotion of a great leader.

=== Initial scientific investigations ===
Curious and inspired by the Copernican cosmology and hardly understanding new ideas of vast, endless, empty space where light would propagate, bodies of matter could move about unhindered, and sound cannot be detected, von Guericke set about replicating this nothing phenomenon on Earth. Von Guericke first started investigating the concept of a vacuum through the use of fire pumps by pumping water out of wooden barrels. However, he soon realised that the porosity of wood was allowing unwanted water, filled with dissolved air, to enter. The pressure fluctuations experienced inside the barrel were allowing this encapsulated air to escape: spoiling the vacuum inside. In 1647 he turned his focus to pumping out enclosed air instead of water to solve this problem.

=== Merging of his scientific and political careers ===
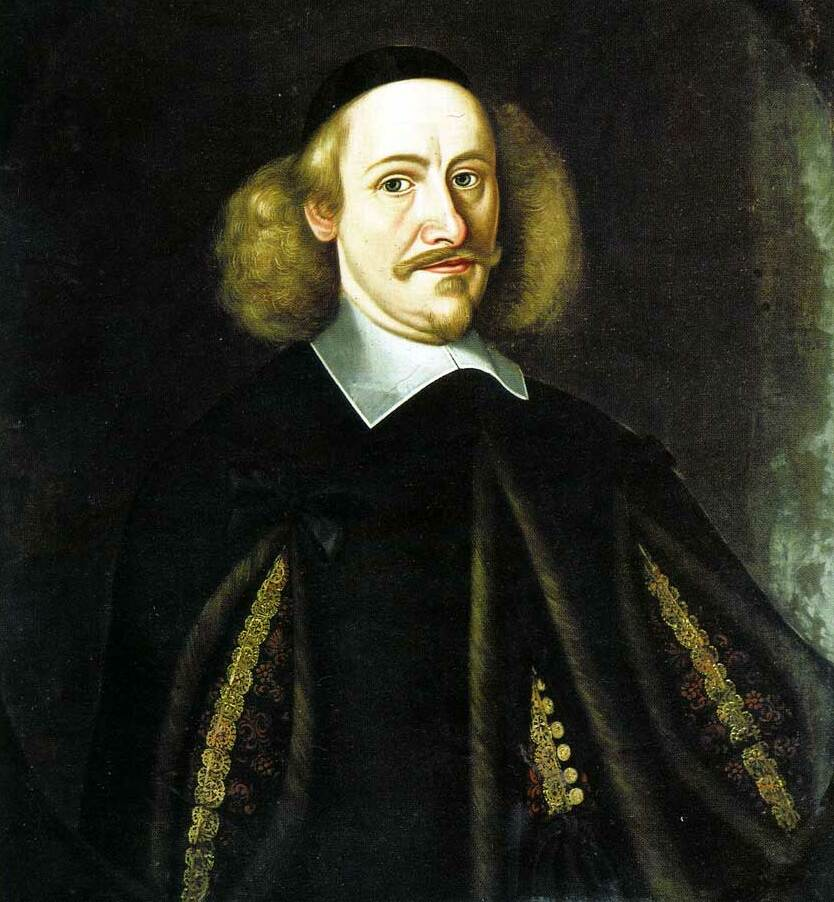
Portrait of Otto von Guericke by Anselm van Hulle (at the Gripsholm Castle)

His scientific and diplomatic pursuits finally intersected when, at the Reichstag in Ratisbon in 1654, he was invited to demonstrate his experiments on the vacuum before the highest dignitaries of the Holy Roman Empire. He built a vacuum pump, pumped air out of two joined Magdeburg hemispheres, attached a team of horses to each side, and had them pull. He demonstrated this again to the King of Prussia in 1663 and was awarded a lifetime pension. One of these dignitaries, the Archbishop Elector Johann Philipp von Schönborn, bought von Guericke's apparatus from him and had it sent to his Jesuit College at Würzburg. One of the professors at the college, Fr. Gaspar Schott, entered into friendly correspondence with von Guericke and thus it was that, at the age of 55, von Guericke's work was first published as an Appendix to a book by Fr. Schott – Mechanica Hydraulico-pneumatica – published in 1657. This book came to the attention of Robert Boyle who, stimulated by it, embarked on his own experiments on air pressure and the vacuum, and in 1660 published New Experiments Physico-Mechanical touching the Spring of Air and its Effects. The following year this was translated into Latin and, made aware of it in correspondence with Fr. Schott, von Guericke acquired a copy.

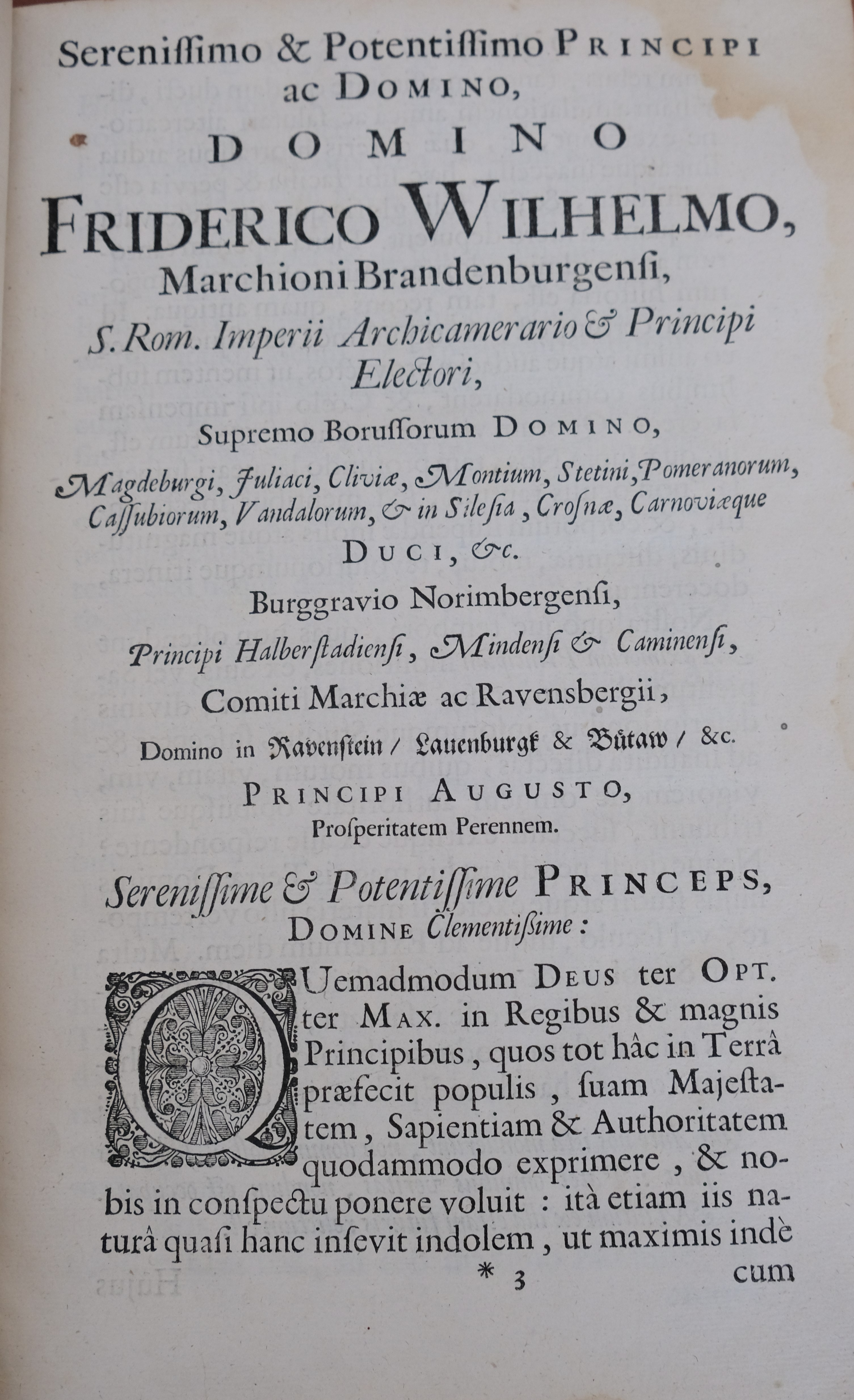
First page of a 1672 copy of "Experimenta Nova (ut vocantur) Magdeburgica de Vacuo Spatio"

In the decade following the first publication of his own work von Guericke, in addition to his diplomatic and administrative commitments, was scientifically very active. He embarked upon his Magnum Opus—Ottonis de Guericke Experimenta Nova (ut vocantur) Magdeburgica de Vacuo Spatio—which as well as a detailed account of his experiments on the vacuum, contains his pioneering electrostatic experiments in which electrostatic repulsion was demonstrated for the first time and he sets out his theologically based view of the nature of space, but there are also contemporary arguments that he did not conceptualise these demonstrations as electrical. In the Preface to the Reader he claims to have finished the book on 14 March 1663, though publication was delayed for another nine years until 1672. In 1664, his work again appeared in print, again through the good offices of Gaspar Schott, the first section of whose book Technica Curiosa, titled Mirabilia Magdeburgica, was dedicated to von Guericke's work. The earliest reference to the celebrated Magdeburg hemispheres experiment is on page 39 of the Technica Curiosa, where Schott notes that von Guericke had mentioned them in a letter of 22 July 1656. Schott goes on to quote a subsequent letter of von Guericke of 4 August 1657, in which he states that he now had carried out the experiment, at considerable cost, with 12 horses.

The 1660s marked the ultimate end for the Magdeburg citizen's hope of achieving Free Imperial City status, a goal to which von Guericke had devoted some twenty years of diplomatic effort. On behalf of Magdeburg, he was the first signatory to the Treaty of Klosterberg in 1666 whereby Magdeburg accepted a garrison of Brandenburg troops (upon the withdrawal of the imperial garrison) and the obligation to pay dues to the Great Elector, Friedrich Wilhelm I of Brandenburg. Despite the Elector's crushing of Magdeburg's political aspirations, the personal relationship of von Guericke and Friedrich Wilhelm remained warm. The Great Elector was a patron of scientific scholarship. He had employed von Guericke's son, Hans Otto, as his resident in Hamburg and in 1666 had called Otto himself to the Brandenburg Rat. When the Experimenta Nova finally appeared it was prefaced with a dedication to Friedrich Wilhelm.

=== Later years ===
In 1677 von Guericke was reluctantly permitted to step down from his civic responsibilities, after repeated requests. In January 1681, as a precaution against an outbreak of the plague then threatening Magdeburg, he and his second wife Dorothea moved to Hamburg, where their son Hans Otto lived. There von Guericke died peacefully on 11 May (Julian) 1686, to the day 55 years after he had fled the siege in 1631. His body was returned to Magdeburg for interment in the Ulrichskirche on 23 May (Julian). The Otto von Guericke University Magdeburg was named in his honour.

=== Primary publications ===
There are three bodies of text, that contain systematic treatises on von Guericke's scientific work.

1. Friar Gaspar Schott's 1657 work Mechanica Hydraulico-pneumatica, originally intended as a brief guide to the hydraulic and pneumatic instruments in Athanasius Kircher's Roman museum, an appendix added by Schott, is a detailed account of Guericke's experiments on vacuums.
2. Friar Gaspar Schott's 1664 Technica Curiosa, with appendix that contains a reupload of the 1657 account plus more recent material from Guericke.
3. Otto von Guericke's Experimenta Nova (ut vocantur) Magdeburgica de Vacuo Spatio of 1672, published upon Guericke's initiative.

The scientific studies and related experiments contained in the above works may be grouped under three topics, to each of which the following books of Experimenta Nova are dedicated:

- Book II: The Nature of Space and the Possibility of the Void
- Book III: The Experimental Work on the Production of Vacua, The Pressure of Air and the Earth's Atmosphere
- Book IV: The Investigation into Cosmic Potencies.
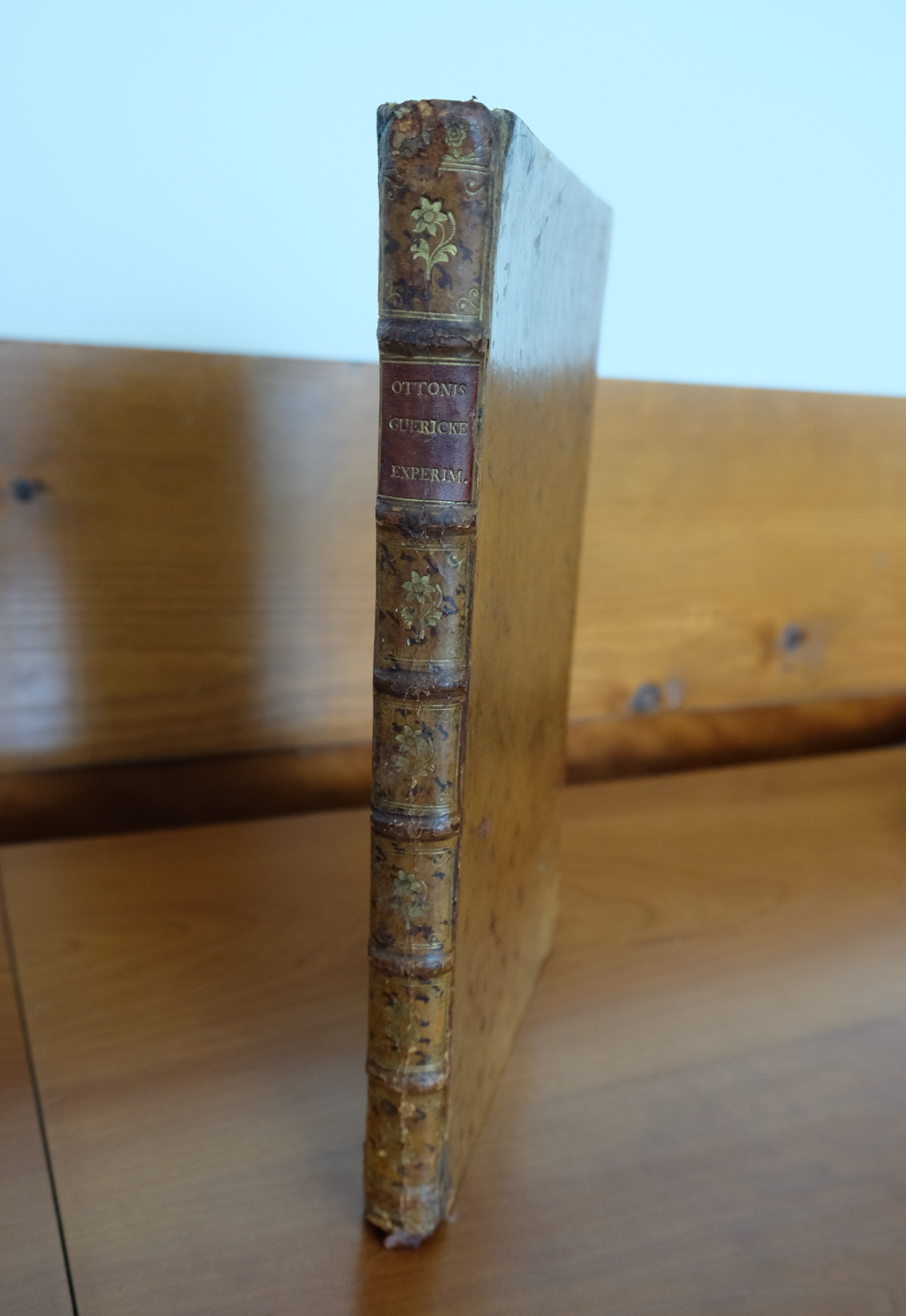
1672 copy of "Experimenta Nova (ut vocantur) Magdeburgica de Vacuo Spatio"

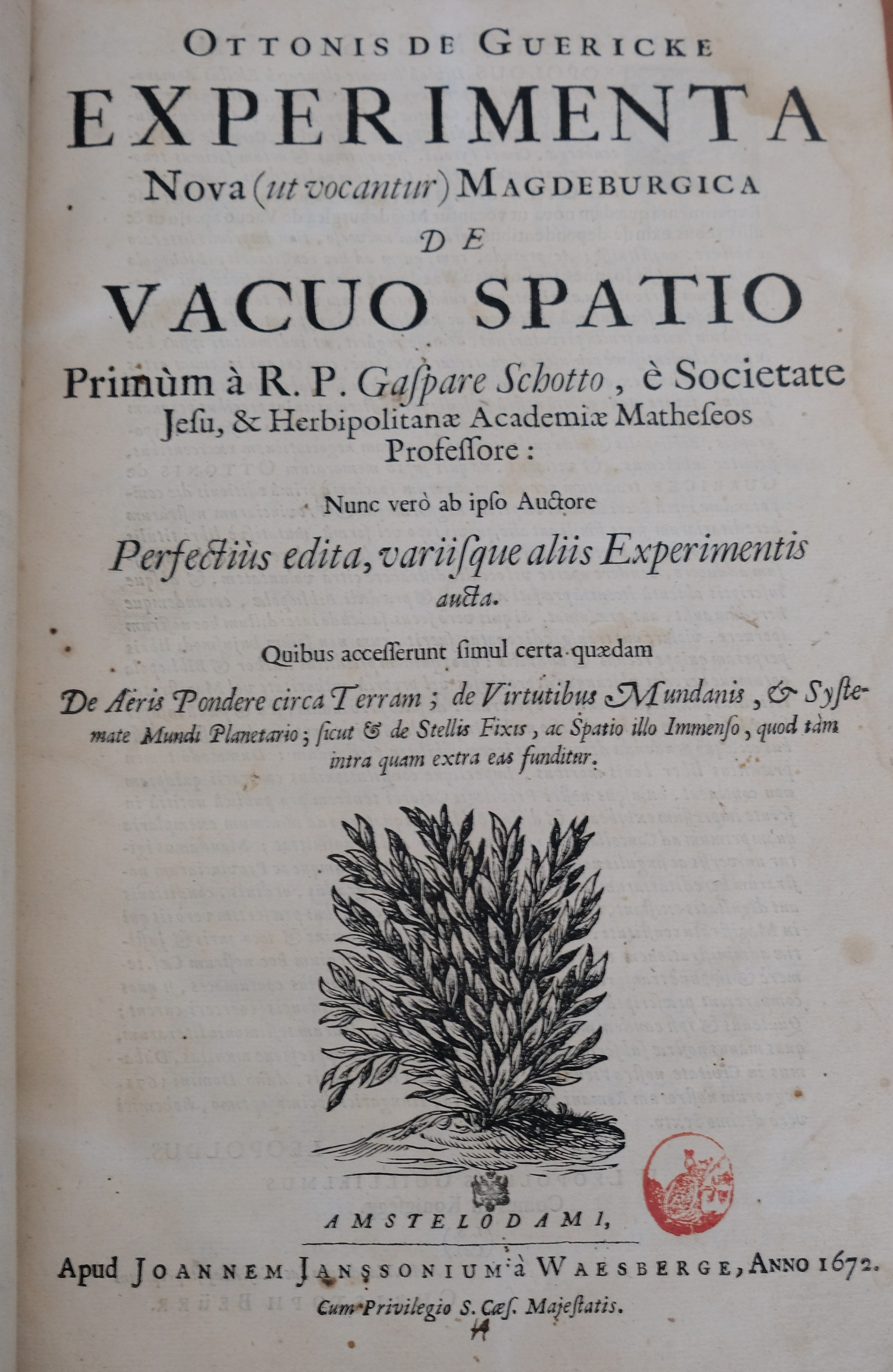
Title page to "Experimenta Nova"

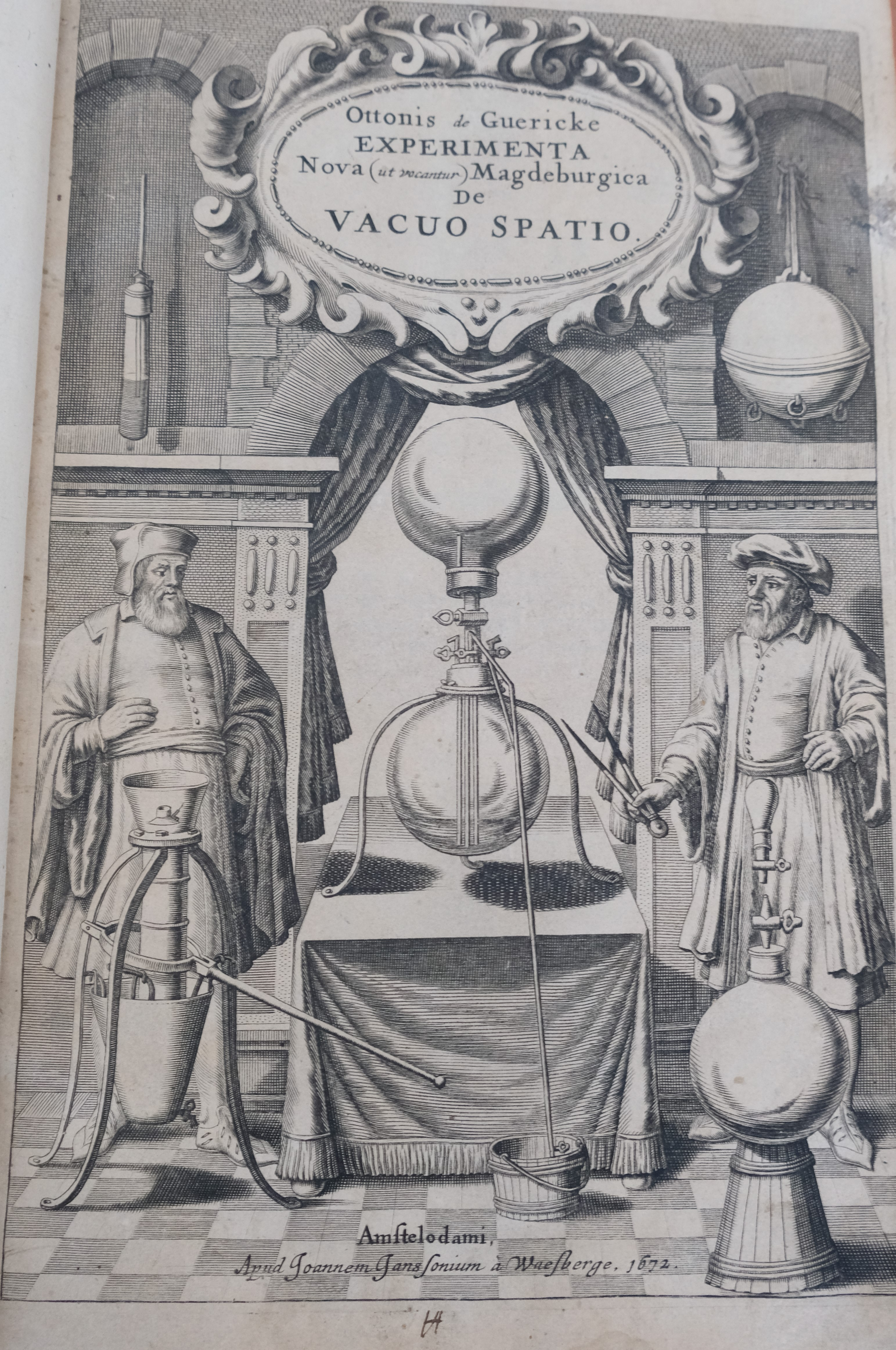
Title page illustration in "Experimenta Nova"

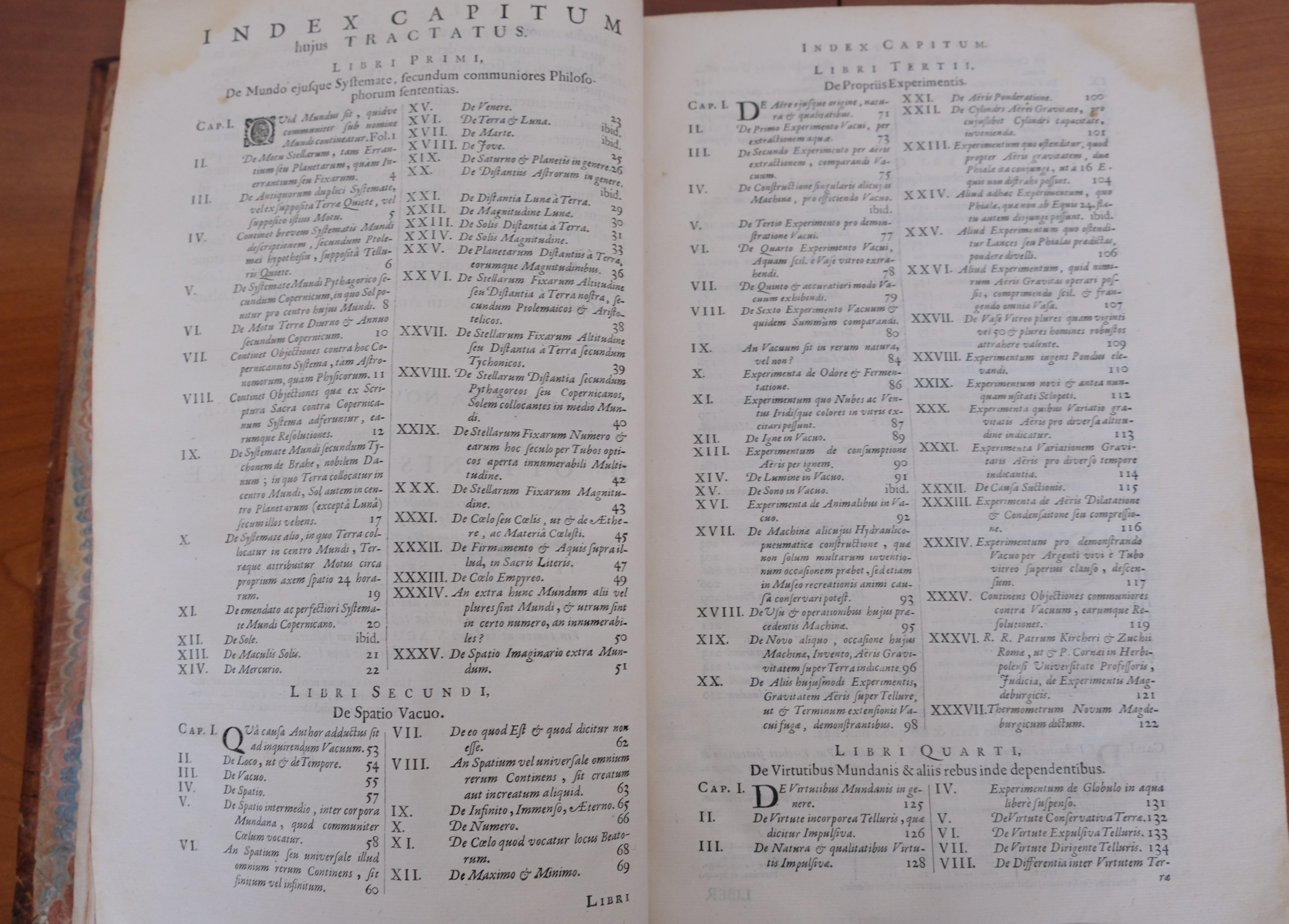
Index to "Experimenta Nova"

== Scientific work ==
=== Nature of Space and the Possibility of the Void ===
Book II of the Experimenta Nova is an extended philosophical essay in which von Guericke puts forward a view of the nature of space similar to that later espoused by Newton. He is explicitly critical of the plenist views of Aristotle and of their adoption by his younger contemporary Descartes. A particular and repeated target of his criticism is the manner in which the "nature abhors a vacuum" principle had migrated from simply a matter of experiment to a high principle of physics which could be invoked to explain phenomena such as suction but which itself was above question. In setting out his own view, von Guericke, while acknowledging the influence of previous philosophers such as Lessius (but not Gassendi), makes it clear that he considers his thinking on this topic to be original and new. There is no evidence that von Guericke was aware of the Nouvelles Experiences touchant le vide of Blaise Pascal published in 1647. In the Experimenta Nova, Book III, Ch. 34, he relates how he first became aware of Torricelli's mercury tube experiment from Valerianus Magnus at Regensburg in 1654. Pascal's work built upon reports of the mercury tube experiment which had reached Paris via Marin Mersenne in 1644. An indication of the unresolved status of the "nature abhors a vacuum" principle at that time may be taken from Pascal's opinion, expressed in the conclusion of the Nouvelles Experiences, when he writes: "I hold for true the maxims set out below: (a) that all bodies possess a repugnance to being separated one from another and from admitting a vacuum in the interval between them – that is to say that nature abhors a void." Pascal goes on to claim that this abhorrence of a void is, however, a limited force and thus that the creation of a vacuum is possible.

There were three broad currents of opinion from which von Guericke dissented. Firstly, there was the Aristotelian view that there simply was no void and that everything that exists objectively is in the category of substance. The general plenist position lost credibility in the 17th century, owing primarily to the success of Newtonian mechanics. It was revived again in the 19th century as a theory of an all-pervading aether and again lost plausibility with the success of Special Relativity. Secondly, there was the Augustinian position of an intimate relation between space, time, and matter; all three, according to St. Augustine in the Confessions (Ch. XI) and the City of God (Book XI, Ch. VI), came into being as a unity and ways of speaking that purport to separate them – such as "outside the universe" or "before the beginning of the universe" are, in fact, meaningless. Augustine's way of thinking is also attractive to many and seems to have a strong resonance with General Relativity. The third view, which von Guericke discusses at length, but does not attribute to any individual, is that space is a creation of the human imagination. Thus, it is not truly objective in the sense in which matter is objective. The later theories of Leibniz and Kant seem inspired by this general outlook, but the denial of the objectivity of space has not been scientifically fruitful.

Von Guericke sidestepped the vexing question of the meaning of "nothing" by asserting that all objective reality fell into one of two categories – the created and the uncreated. Space and time were objectively real but were uncreated, whereas matter was created. In this way he created a new fundamental category alongside Aristotle's category of substance, that of the uncreated. His understanding of space is theological and similar to that expressed by Newton in the General Scholium to the Principia. For instance, von Guericke writes (Book II, Chapter VII): "For God cannot be contained in any location, nor in any vacuum, nor in any space, for He Himself is, of His nature, location and vacuum."

=== Air pressure and the vacuum ===
In 1650 von Guericke invented the vacuum pump. His model consisting of a piston and an air gun cylinder with two-way flaps designed to pull air out of whatever vessel it was connected to, and used it to investigate the properties of the vacuum in many experiments. Guericke demonstrated the force of air pressure with dramatic experiments.

In 1657, he machined two 20-inch diameter hemispheres and pumped all the air out of them, locking them together with a vacuum seal. The air pressure outside held the halves together so tightly that sixteen horses, eight harnessed to each side of the globe, could not pull the halves apart. It would have required more than 4,000 pounds of force to separate them. It is estimated that by pumping the air out of these spheres, he was able to reduce the internal pressure to roughly 1/25 of an atmosphere.

With his experiments Guericke disproved the hypothesis of "horror vacui", that nature abhors a vacuum. Aristotle (e.g. in Physics IV 6–9) had argued against the existence of the void and his views commanded near-universal endorsement by philosophers and scientists up to the 17th century. Guericke showed that substances were not pulled by a vacuum, but were pushed by the pressure of the surrounding fluids.

All of von Guericke's work on the vacuum and air pressure is described in Book III of the Experimenta Nova (1672). As regards the more detailed chronology of his work we have, in addition to the Experimenta Nova's description of his demonstrations at Regensburg in 1654, the two accounts published by Fr. Schott in 1657 and 1663.

In Chapter 27 he alludes to what transpired at Regensburg in 1654. The first experiment he explicitly records as having been demonstrated was the crushing of a non-spherical vessel as the air was withdrawn from it. He did not use a vacuum pump directly on the vessel, but allowed the air in it to expand into a previously evacuated receiver.

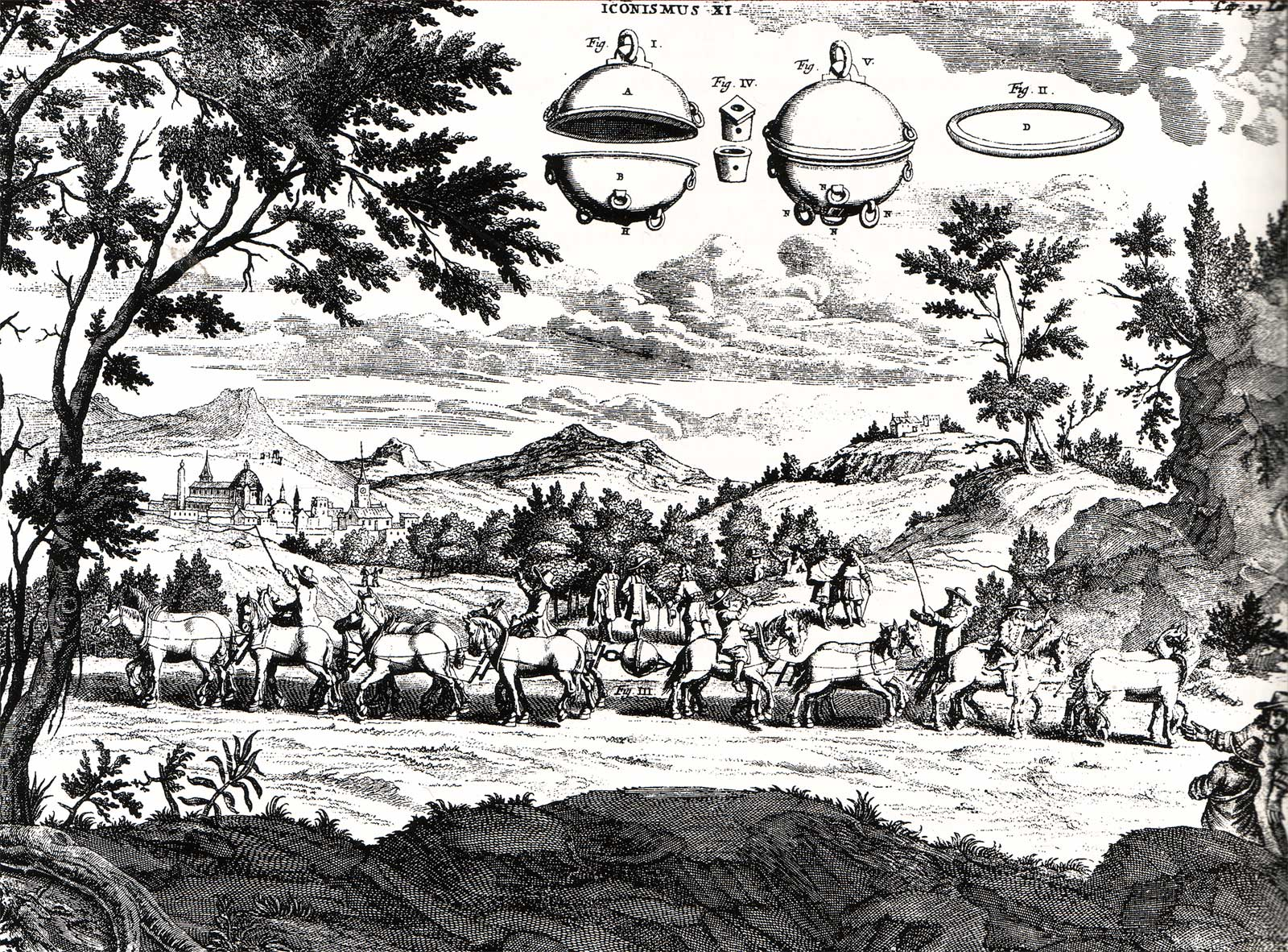
Engraving of the Magdeburg hemispheres experiment by Gaspar Schott

The second was an experiment in which a number of men proved able to pull an airtight piston only about halfway up a cylindrical copper vessel. Von Guericke then attached his evacuated receiver to the space below the piston and succeeded in drawing the piston back down again against the force of the men pulling it up. In a letter to Friar Schott of June 1656, reproduced in Mechanica Hydraulico-pneumatica (pp. 454–55), von Guericke gives a short account of his experiences at Regensburg. Based on this, Schimank [1936] gives a list of ten experiments that he considers likely to have been carried out at Regensburg. In addition to the above two, these included the extraction of air using a vacuum pump, the extinction of a flame in a sealed vessel, the raising of water by suction, a demonstration that air has weight, and a demonstration of how fog and mist can be produced in a sealed vessel. The Mechanica Hydraulico-pneumatica also provides the earliest drawing of von Guericke's vacuum pump. This corresponds to the description in the opening chapters of Book III of the Experimenta Nova of the first version of his pump.

Stimulated by the interest taken in his work, von Guericke was scientifically very active in the decade after 1654. In June 1656 we find him writing to Fr. Schott (Mechanica Hydraulico-pneumatica, p. 444) "Since the time when I produced the exhibition for the said eminent Elector, I have a better and clearer grasp of all these matters and many other topics as well." The celebrated hemispheres experiment was, as noted in the biographical section above, carried out between July 1656 and August 1657. In Chapter IV of Book III he describes a new and much-improved design of vacuum pump and attributes its invention to the need for a more easily transportable machine with which he could demonstrate his experiments to Frederick William, who had expressed the desire to see them. The new pump is also described on p. 67 of the Technica Curiosa. The demonstration in the Elector's Library at Cölln an der Spree took place in November 1663 and was recorded by a tutor to the Elector's sons. (Schneider p. 113.) A number of experiments, such as the rather cruel testing of the effect of a vacuum on birds and fish (Experimenta Nova, Book III, Chapter XVI), are not described in the Technica Curiosa. Although the Experimenta Nova does contain correspondence from 1665, there is no reason to doubt von Guericke's assertion that the work was essentially finished by March 1663.

Throughout Books II and III he returns again and again to the theme of there being no abhorrence of a vacuum and that all the phenomena explained by this supposed principle are in fact attributable to the pressure of the atmosphere in conjunction with various incorporeal potencies which he held to be acting. Thus the Earth's "conservative potency" (virtus conservativa) provided the explanation for the fact that the Earth retains its atmosphere though travelling through space. In countering the objection of a Dr. Deusing that the weight of the atmosphere would simply crush the bodies of all living things, he shows explicit awareness of the key property of a fluid – that it exerts pressure equally across all planes. In Chapter XXX of Book III he writes: "Dr. Deusing ought to have borne in mind that the air does not just press on our heads but flows all around us. Just as it presses from above on the head, it likewise presses on the soles of the feet from below and simultaneously on all parts of the body from all directions."

==== Relevant research ====
In the Experimenta Nova, Book III, Chapter 20, von Guericke reports on a barometer he had constructed and its application to weather forecasting. The earliest reference to his barometer is in a letter to Fr. Schott of November 1661 (Technica Curiosa, p. 37) where he writes: "I have observed the variation in the weight of the air by using a little man (i.e. a statue in the form of one) who hangs from a wall in my hypocaust where it floats on air in a glass tube and uses a finger to show the weight or lightness of the air. At the same time it indicates whether or not it is raining in nearby localities or whether there is unusually stormy weather at sea." In a subsequent letter of 30 December 1661 (Technica Curiosa p. 52) he gives a somewhat amplified account. His barometer thus prepared the way for meteorology. His later works focused on electricity. He invented the "Elektrisiermaschine", a version of which is illustrated in the engraving by Hubert-François Gravelot, c. 1750. This device, which is usually identified as the first electrostatic generator, was developed as part of von Guericke's interest in the worldly powers (mundane virtues) that operated in the universe. Von Guericke also showed that electrical (magnetic) attraction does not require a medium to operate in by an experiment using electrical transmission through linen thread.

=== Electrostatic investigations ===
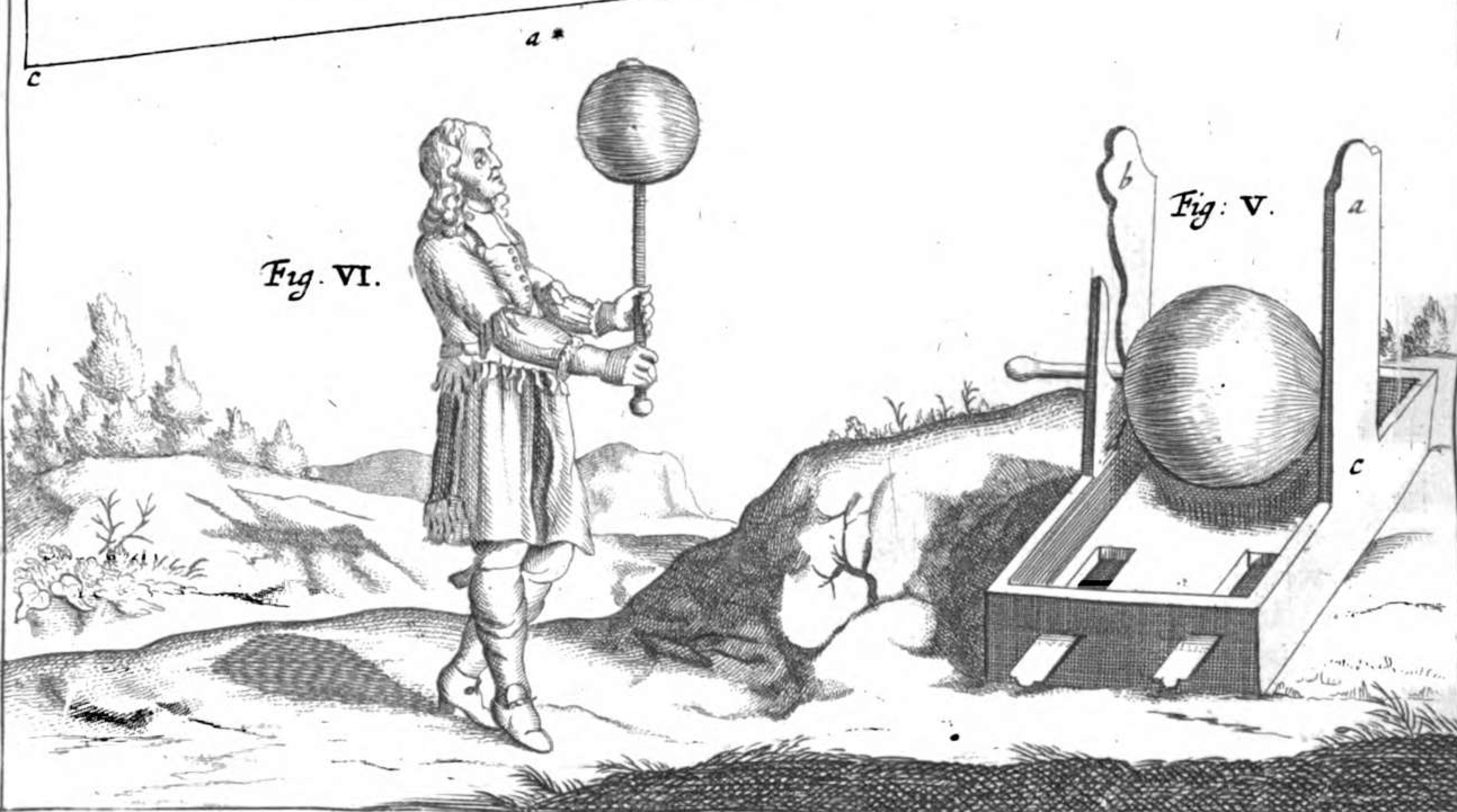
Guericke's experiments with the sulfur globe published 1672

Von Guericke thought of the capacity of body to exert an influence beyond its immediate boundaries in terms of "corporeal and incorporeal potencies". Examples of corporeal potencies were the giving off of fumes, smells, gases etc. by bodies. An example of an incorporeal potency was the Earth's "conservative potency" whereby it retained its atmosphere and caused the return of objects thrown upwards to the Earth's surface. The Earth also possessed an "expulsive potency" which was deemed to explain why objects that fall bounce back up again. The notion of an "incorporeal potency" is similar to that of "action at a distance", except the former notion remained purely qualitative and there is no inkling of the fundamental "action and reaction" principle.

Von Guericke describes his work on electrostatics in Chapter 15 of Book IV of the Experimenta Nova. In a letter of November 1661 to Fr. Schott, reproduced in the Technica Curiosa, he notes that the then projected Book IV would be concerned with "cosmic potencies" (virtutes mundanae). Accepting the claim of the preface to the Experimenta Nova that the entire work had been essentially completed before March 1663, von Guericke can be fairly credited with inventing a primitive form of frictional electrical machine before 1663. His electrostatic generator was created using a sulphur globe attached to an iron rod. By rubbing the sphere with a dry hand, von Guericke was able to impart a charge imbalance on the surface, which would allow him to attract and repel other objects.

In Chapter 6 of Book IV von Guericke writes: "It seems reasonable to suppose that if the Earth has a fitting and appropriate attractive potency it will also have a potency of repelling things that might be dangerous or disagreeable to it. This is to be seen in the case of the sulphur sphere described below in Chapter 15. When that sphere is stroked or rubbed not only does it attract all light objects, but it sometimes arbitrarily also repels them before attracting them again. Sometimes indeed it doesn't even attract them again." Von Guericke was aware of both Gilbert's book On the Magnet and Magnetic bodies and on the great magnet the Earth (De Magnete) published in 1600 and of the Jesuit Niccolo Cabeo's Philosophia Magnetica (1629). He does not explicitly acknowledge any anticipation of his demonstration of electrostatic repulsion by the latter but, as he quotes a passage from the same page, could not have been unaware that, in a discussion of the nature of electrical attraction, Cabeo had written (Philosophia Magnetica, p. 192): "When we see that small bodies (corpuscula) are lifted (sublevari et attolli) above the amber and also fall back to the motionless amber, it cannot be said that such erratic behaviour (talem matum – but if "matum" is taken as a misprint for "motum", then the translation is simply "such motion") is an attraction by the gravity of the attracting body." In Book IV, Chapter 8 of the Experimenta Nova von Guericke is at pains to point out the difference between his own "incorporeal potency" views and Cabeo's more Aristotelian conclusions. He writes: "Writers who have written on magnetism, always confuse it with electrical attraction, although there is a great difference. In particular, Gilbert in his book De Magnete claims that electrical attraction is caused by the effluence of a humour, that the humid seeks the humid and this is the cause of the attraction. Moreover in Philosophia Magnetica, Book 2, Chapter 21, Cabeo criticises Gilbert but does admit that this attraction is created by the agency of an effluent. Humidity does not play any role but the attraction is brought about purely by the agency of an effluent, by which the air is disturbed. After the initial impulse, the air returns to the amber again taking with it little particles. He (Cabeo) concludes by saying: 'I say therefore that from amber or any other electrically attracting body, a very rarefied effluent is emitted which dispels and attenuates the air, extremely agitating it. Then the agitated and attenuated air returns to the amber body sweeping along with it whatever dust or small bodies are in its way'. We however, who in the previous chapter, take the attraction of the sulphur ball as electrical in nature and operating through a conservative potency, cannot admit that the air plays a role in producing the attraction. Experiment visibly shows that this sulphur globe (once it has been rubbed) also exercises its potency through a linen cord up to a range of a cubit and more and can attract at that distance." Unknown to them at the time, this "mysterious" attraction and repulsion they had been witnessing was actually electrical conduction.

The key Chapter 15 is titled "On an experiment, in which these potencies, listed above, can be evoked by the rubbing of a sulphur ball." In Section 3 of this chapter, he describes how light bodies are repelled from a sulphur sphere which has been rubbed with a dry hand, and are not again attracted until they have touched another body. Oldenburg's review of the Experimenta Nova (November 1672) in the Proceedings of the Royal Society sceptically observes: "How far this globe may be confided in, the Tryals and Consideration of some ingenious person here may perhaps inform us hereafter." In fact, Robert Boyle repeated von Guericke's experiments for the Royal Society in November 1672 and February 1673.

== See also ==
- Air pump
- Cloud physics
- Thermoscope

== Sources ==
- Schott, Kaspar (1687). Technica Curiosa. Nürnberg: Verlag: Endter.
- Conlon, Thomas E. (2011). Thinking About Nothing: Otto von Guericke and the Magdeburg Experiments on the Vacuum. The Saint Austin Press. ISBN 978-14478-3916-3.
- Schneider, Ditmar (2002). Otto von Guericke: ein Leben für die alte Stadt Magdeburg (in German) (3. bearb. und erw. Aufl. ed.). Stuttgart: Teubner. ISBN 3-519-25153-1.
- Hoffman, Friedrich Wilhelm (1874). Otto von Guericke, Bürgermeister der Stadt Magdeburg: Ein Lebensbild aus der Deutschen Geschichte des Siebzehnten Jahrhunderts. Verlag von Emil Baensch. ISBN 9781145081925.
- Puhle, Matthias (2002). Die Welt im leeren Raum. Otto von Guericke 1602–1686. München: Deutscher Kunstverlag. ISBN 978-3-422-06374-7.
- Rubini, Paolo (2019). Leibniz und Guericke im Diskurs, Die Exzerpte aus den Experimenta Nova und der Briefwechsel. De Gruyter Verlag. ISBN 978-3-11-053392-7.
- Kauffeldt, Alfons (1966). Otto von Guericke; Philosophisches über den leeren Raum. Berlin: Akademie-Verlag. ISBN 9781145081925.
- Liebers, Klaus (2016). Das Wunder Vakuum. Experimente, die Geschichte schrieben. Berlin: Verlag epubli. ISBN 978-3-7375-9188-1.
- Liebers, Klaus (2015). Otto von Guericke und das Abenteuer Vakuum. Berlin: Verlag epubli. ISBN 978-3-7375-3662-2.
- Fischer, Johann Carl (1802). Geschichte der Physik seit der Wiederherstellung der Künste und Wissenschaften bis auf die neuesten Zeiten. Röwer.
- Schimank, Hans [in German] (1936). Otto von Guericke, Bürgermeister von Magdeburg. Ein deutscher Staatsmann, Denker und Forscher. Stadt Magdeburg.
