= The Betrothed (disambiguation) =

The Betrothed (I promessi sposi) is an 1827–1842 historical novel by Italian author Alessandro Manzoni.

Betrothed or The Betrothed may also refer to:

- The Betrothed (Scott novel), an 1825 novel by Sir Walter Scott
- "The Betrothed" (poem), an 1886 poem by Rudyard Kipling
- The Betrothed (miniseries), a 1989 Italian TV mini-series directed by Salvatore Nocita
- The Betrothed (1923 film), a silent Italian film directed by Mario Bonnard
- The Betrothed (1941 film), an Italian film directed by Mario Camerini
- The Betrothed (1964 film), an Italian film directed by Mario Maffei
- "Betrothed" (short story), a 1903 short story by Anton Chekhov

== See also ==
- Betrothal
- I promessi sposi (disambiguation)
