= Cigar =

Rolled bundle of dried and fermented tobacco leaves made to be smoked

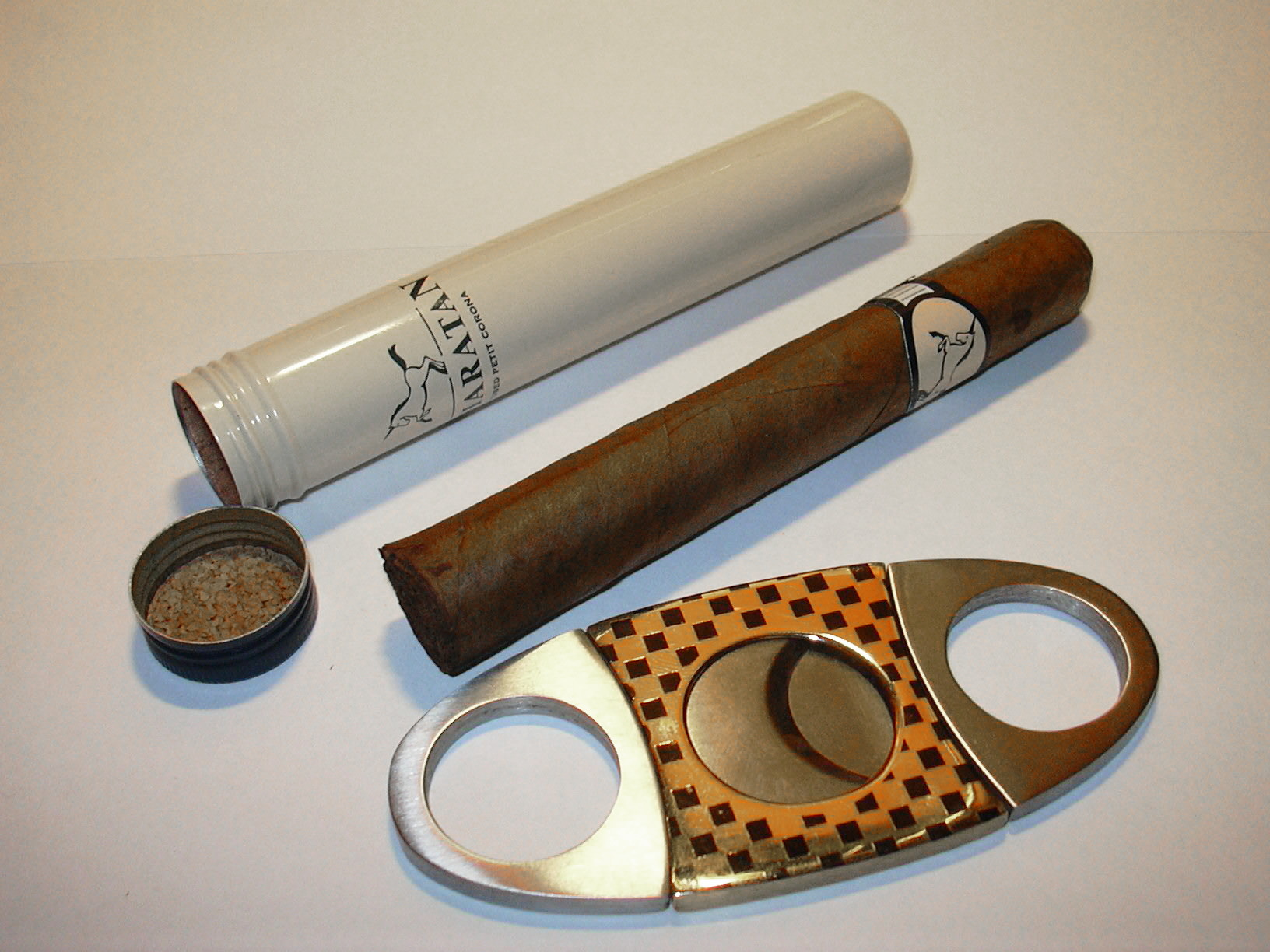
A cigar with a semi-airtight storage tube and a double guillotine-style cutter

A cigar is a rolled bundle of dried and fermented tobacco leaves made to be smoked. Cigars are produced in a variety of sizes and shapes. Since the 20th century, almost all cigars are made of three distinct components: the filler, the binder leaf which holds the filler together, and a wrapper leaf, which is often the highest quality leaf used. Often there will be a cigar band printed with the cigar manufacturer's logo. Modern cigars can come with two or more bands, especially Cuban cigars, showing Limited Edition (Edición Limitada) bands displaying the year of production.

Cigar tobacco is grown in significant quantities primarily in Brazil, Central America (Costa Rica, Ecuador, Guatemala, Honduras, Mexico, Nicaragua, and Panama), and the islands of the Caribbean (Cuba, the Dominican Republic, Haiti, and Puerto Rico); it is also produced in the Eastern United States (mostly in Florida, Kentucky, Tennessee, and Virginia) and in the Mediterranean countries of Italy, Greece, Spain (in the Canary Islands), and Turkey, and to a lesser degree in Indonesia and the Philippines of Southeast Asia. The African nation of Cameroon has also started growing wrappers - Tobacco grown in the neighboring Central African Republic is also often classified as Cameroon.

Cigar smoking carries serious health risks, including increased risk of developing various types and subtypes of cancers, respiratory diseases, cardiovascular diseases, cerebrovascular diseases, periodontal diseases, teeth decay and loss, and malignant diseases. In the United States, the tobacco industry and cigar brands have aggressively targeted African Americans and Non-Hispanic Whites with customized advertising techniques and tobacco-related lifestyle magazines since the 1990s.

== Etymology ==
The word cigar originally derives from the Mayan sikar ("to smoke rolled tobacco leaves"—from si'c, "tobacco"). The Spanish word, "cigarro" spans the gap between the Mayan and modern use. The English word came into general use in 1730.

== History ==
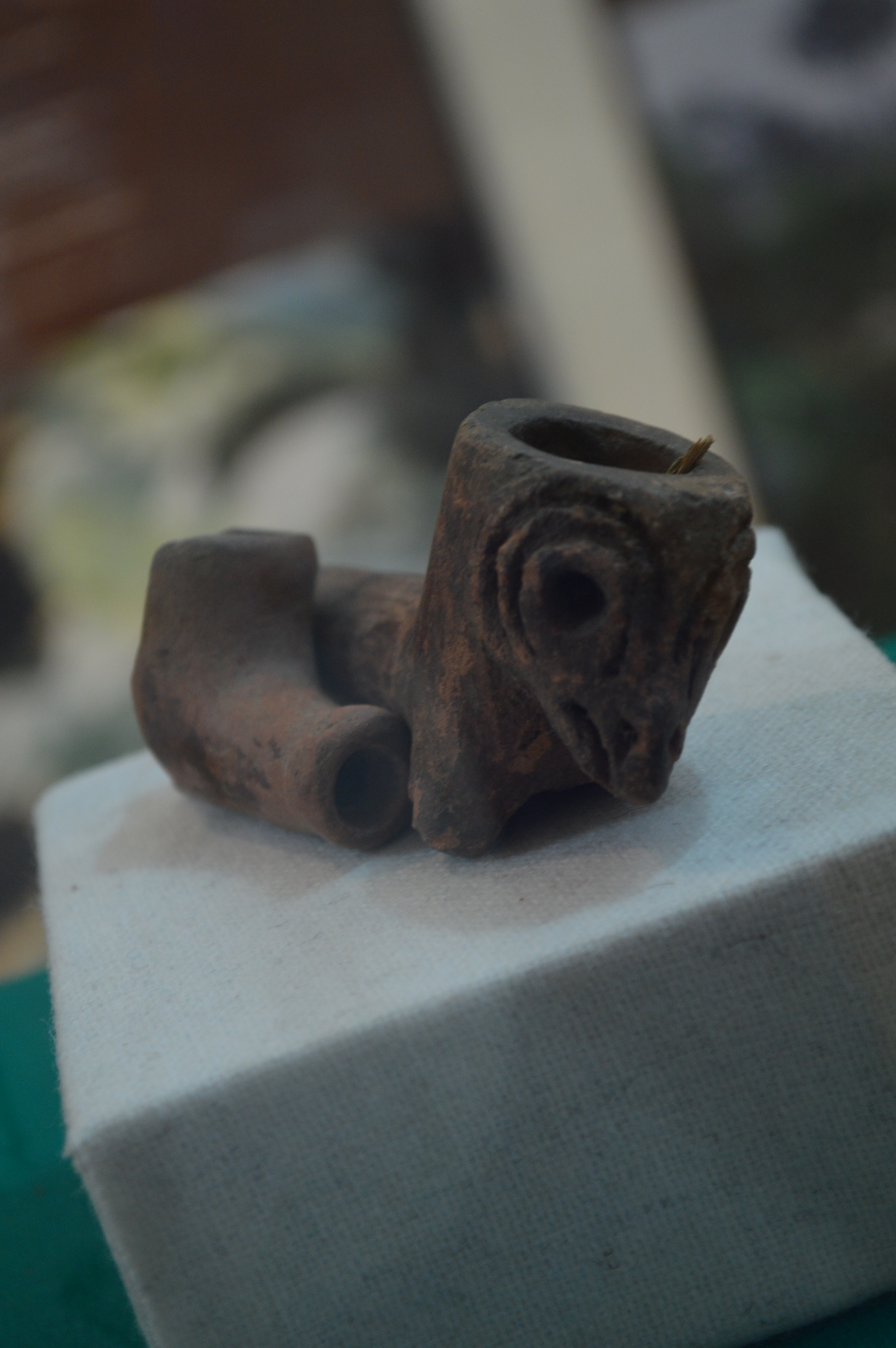
Indigenous tobacco pipe on display at the regional museum in San Andrés Tuxtla, Mexico

Although the origins of cigar smoking are unknown, cigar smoking was first observed by European explorers when encountering the indigenous Taino people of Cuba in 1492. While tobacco was widely diffused among many of the Indigenous peoples of the islands of the Caribbean, it was completely unfamiliar to Europeans before the discovery of the New World in the 15th century. The Spanish historian, landowner, and Dominican friar Bartolomé de las Casas vividly described how the first scouts sent by Christopher Columbus into the interior of Cuba found

Men with half-burned wood in their hands and certain herbs to take their smokes, which are some dry herbs put in a certain leaf, also dry, like those the boys make on the day of the Passover of the Holy Ghost; and having lighted one part of it, by the other they suck, absorb, or receive that smoke inside with the breath, by which they become benumbed and almost drunk, and so it is said they do not feel fatigue. These, muskets as we will call them, they call tabacos. I knew Spaniards on this island of Española who were accustomed to take it, and being reprimanded for it, by telling them it was a vice, they replied they were unable to cease using it. I do not know what relish or benefit they found in it.

Following the arrival of Europeans with the first wave of European colonization, tobacco became one of the primary products fueling European colonialism, and also became a driving factor in the incorporation of African slave labor. The Spanish introduced tobacco to Europeans in about 1528, and by 1533, Diego Columbus mentioned a tobacco merchant of Lisbon in his will, showing how quickly the traffic had sprung up. The French, Spanish, and Portuguese initially referred to the plant as the "sacred herb" because of its alleged medicinal properties.

In time, Spanish and other European sailors adopted the practice of smoking rolls of leaves, as did the Spanish and Portuguese conquistadors. Smoking primitive cigars spread to Spain, Portugal, and eventually France, most probably through Jean Nicot, the French ambassador to Portugal, who gave his name to nicotine. Later, tobacco use spread to the Italian kingdoms, the Dutch Empire, and, after Sir Walter Raleigh's voyages to the Americas, to Great Britain. Tobacco smoking became familiar throughout Europe—in pipes in Britain—by the mid-16th century.

Spanish cultivation of tobacco began in earnest in 1531 on the islands of Hispaniola and Santo Domingo. In 1542, tobacco started to be grown commercially in North America, when Spaniards established the first cigar factory in Cuba. Tobacco was originally thought to have medicinal qualities, but some considered it evil. It was denounced by Philip II of Spain and James I of England.

Around 1592, the Spanish galleon San Clemente brought 50 kilograms (110 lb) of tobacco seed to the Philippines over the Acapulco-Manila trade route. It was distributed among Roman Catholic missionaries, who found excellent climates and soils for growing high-quality tobacco there. The use of the cigar did not become popular until the mid 18th century, and although there are few drawings from this era, there are some reports.

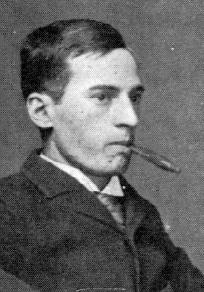
Harry Nelson Pillsbury smoking a cigar

It is believed that Israel Putnam brought back a cache of Havana cigars during the Seven Years' War, making cigar smoking popular in the US after the American Revolution. He also brought Cuban tobacco seeds, which he planted in the Hartford area of New England. This reportedly resulted in the development of the renowned shade-grown Connecticut wrapper.

Towards the end of the 18th century and in the 19th century, cigar smoking was common, while cigarettes were comparatively rare. Towards the end of the 19th century, Rudyard Kipling wrote his famous smoking poem, The Betrothed (1886). The cigar business was an important industry and factories employed many people before mechanized manufacturing of cigars became practical. Cigar workers in both Cuba and the US were active in labor strikes and disputes from early in the 19th century, and the rise of modern labor unions can be traced to the CMIU and other cigar worker unions.

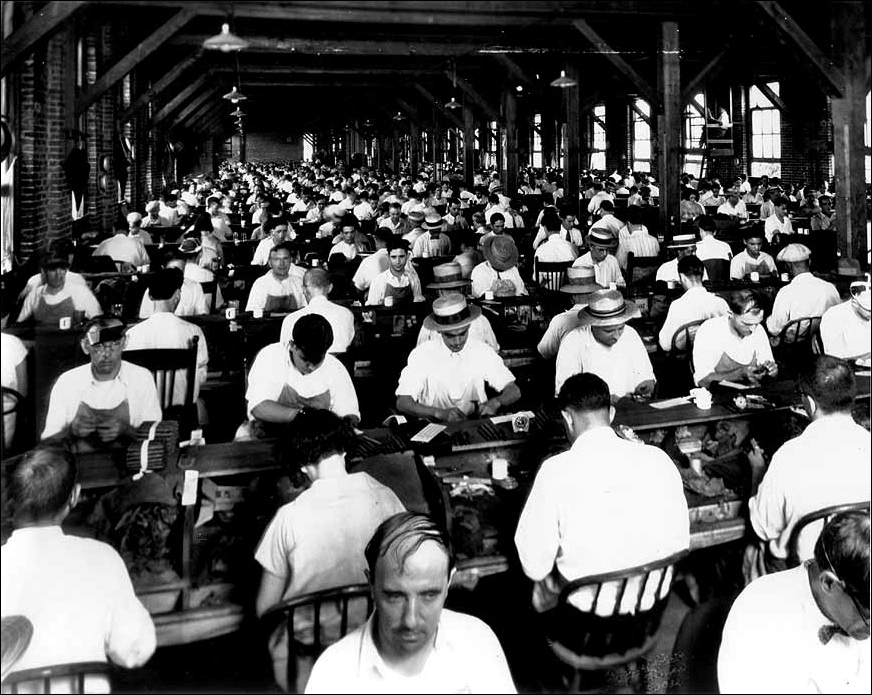
Inside an Ybor City cigar factory c. 1920

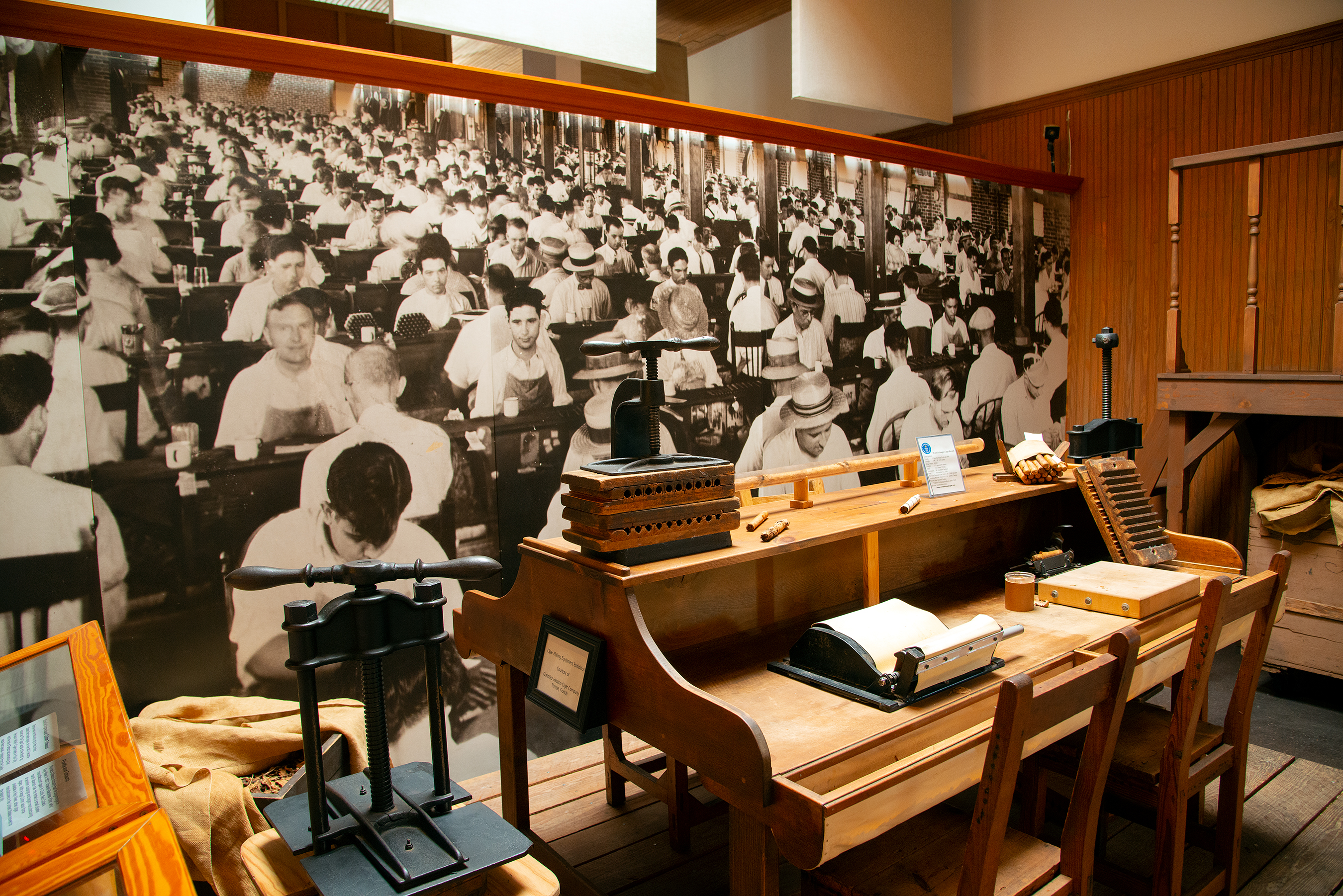
Hand rolling cigars and relevant artifacts, Ybor City Museum State Park display, Tampa, Florida

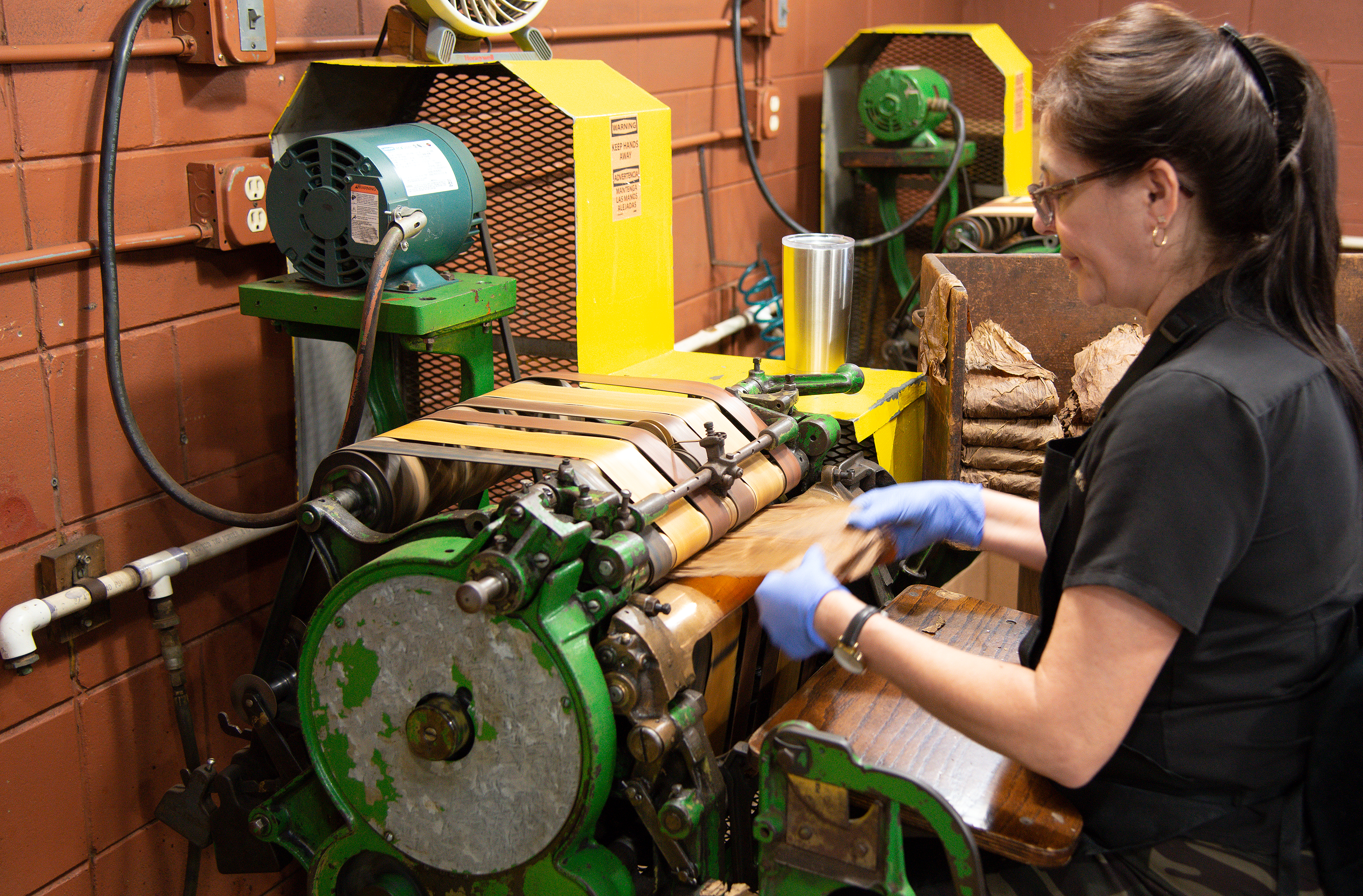
Cigar making at Tampa's J.C. Newman Cigar Company, using machines from the 1930s

In 1869, Spanish cigar manufacturer Vicente Martinez Ybor moved his Principe de Gales (Prince of Wales) operations from the cigar manufacturing center of Havana, Cuba to Key West, Florida to escape the turmoil of the Ten Years' War. Other manufacturers followed, and Key West became an important cigar manufacturing center. In 1885, Ybor moved again, buying land near the small city of Tampa, Florida and building the largest cigar factory in the world at the time in the new company town of Ybor City. Friendly rival and Flor de Sánchez y Haya owner Ignacio Haya built his factory nearby the same year, and many other cigar manufacturers followed, especially after an 1886 fire that gutted much of Key West. Thousands of Cuban and Spanish tabaqueros came to the area from Key West, Cuba and New York to produce hundreds of millions of cigars annually. Local output peaked in 1929, when workers in Ybor City and West Tampa rolled over 500 million "clear Havana" cigars, earning the town the nickname "Cigar Capital of the World". At its peak, there were 150 cigar factories in Ybor city, but by early in the next decade, nearly all of the factories had closed. Only one company still makes cigars in the Ybor City area, the J. C. Newman Cigar Company, which moved to Tampa from Ohio in 1954 and took over the previous Regensburg cigar factory. The company was continuing to utilize some antique, hand-operated ARENCO and American Machine and Foundry cigarmaking machines from the 1930's.

In New York, cigars were made by rollers working in their homes. It was reported that as of 1883, cigars were being manufactured in 127 apartment houses in New York, employing 1,962 families and 7,924 individuals. A state statute banning the practice, passed late that year at the urging of trade unions on the basis that the practice suppressed wages, was ruled unconstitutional less than four months later. The industry, which had relocated to Brooklyn (then a separate municipality) and other places on Long Island while the law was in effect, then returned to New York.

In 1905, there were 80,000 cigar-making operations in the US, most of them small, family-operated shops where cigars were rolled and sold immediately. While most cigars are now made by machine, some, as a matter of prestige and quality, are rolled by hand—especially in Central America and Cuba, as well as in small chinchales in sizable cities in the US.

== Manufacture ==
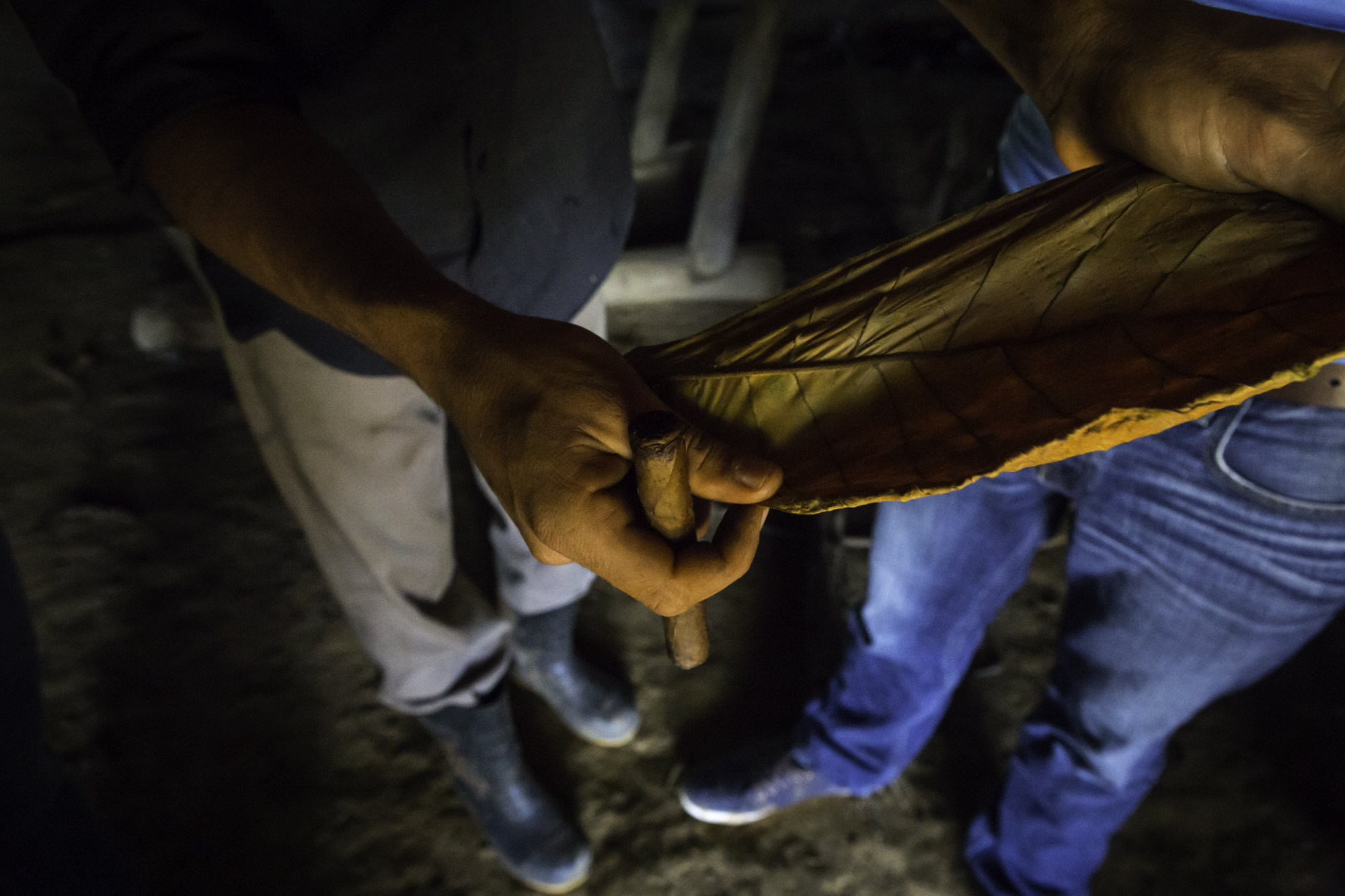
An aged tobacco leaf being examined

Cigar makers in Puerto Rico, c. 1942

Cigars making in Inle Lake (Myanmar)

Tobacco leaves are harvested and aged using a curing process that combines heat and shade to reduce sugar and water content without causing the larger leaves to rot. This takes between 25 and 45 days, depending upon climatic conditions and the nature of sheds used to store harvested tobacco. Curing varies by type of tobacco and desired leaf color. A slow fermentation follows, where temperature and humidity are controlled to enhance flavor, aroma, and burning characteristics while forestalling rot or disintegration.

The leaf will continue to be baled, inspected, un-baled, re-inspected, and baled again during the aging cycle. When it has matured to manufacturer's specifications it is sorted for appearance and overall quality, and used as filler or wrapper accordingly. During this process, leaves are continually moistened to prevent damage.

Quality cigars are still handmade. An experienced cigar-roller can produce hundreds of good, nearly identical cigars per day. The rollers keep the tobacco moist—especially the wrapper—and use specially designed crescent-shaped knives, called chavetas, to form the filler and wrapper leaves quickly and accurately. Once rolled, the cigars are stored in wooden forms as they dry, in which their uncapped ends are cut to a uniform size. From this stage, the cigar is a complete product that can be "laid down" and aged for decades if kept as close to 21 °C (70 °F) and 70% relative humidity as possible. Once purchased, proper storage is typically in a specialized cedar-lined wooden humidor.

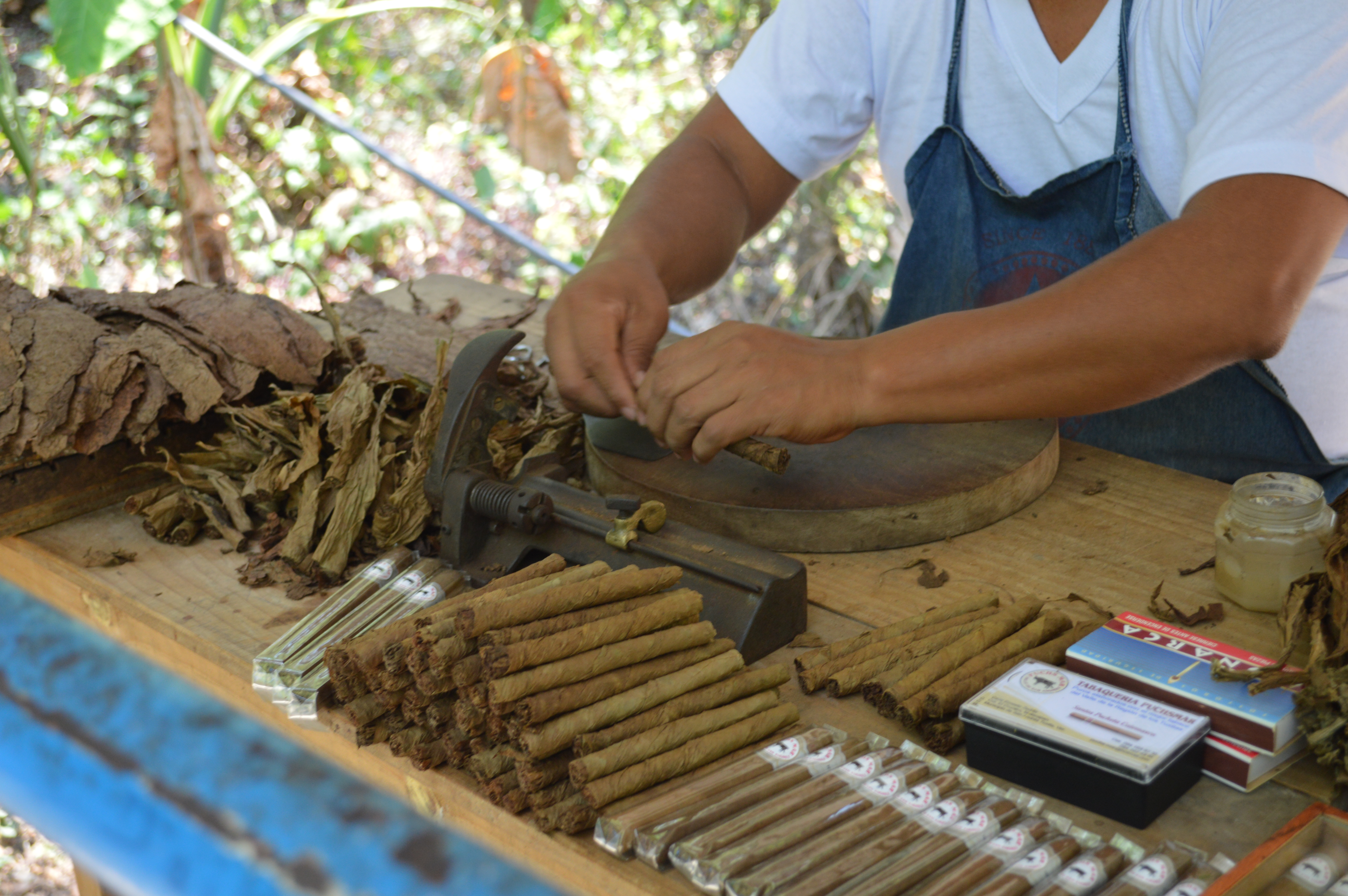
Vendor rolling cigars at the Eyipantla Falls in San Andrés Tuxtla, Mexico

Some cigars, especially premium brands, use different varieties of tobacco for the filler and the wrapper. Long filler cigars are a far higher quality of cigar, using long leaves throughout. These cigars also use a third variety of tobacco leaf, called a "binder", between the filler and the outer wrapper. This permits the makers to use more delicate and attractive leaves as a wrapper. These high-quality cigars almost always blend varieties of tobacco. Even Cuban long-filler cigars will combine tobaccos from different parts of the island to incorporate several different flavors.

In low-grade and machine-made cigars, chopped tobacco leaves are used for the filler, and long leaves or a type of "paper" made from reconstituted tobacco pulp is used for the wrapper. Chopped leaves and a pulp wrapper alter the flavor and burning characteristics of the result vis-a-vis handmade cigars.

Historically, a lector or reader was employed to entertain cigar factory workers. This practice became obsolete once audiobooks for portable music players became available, but it is still practiced in some Cuban factories.

=== Dominant manufacturers ===
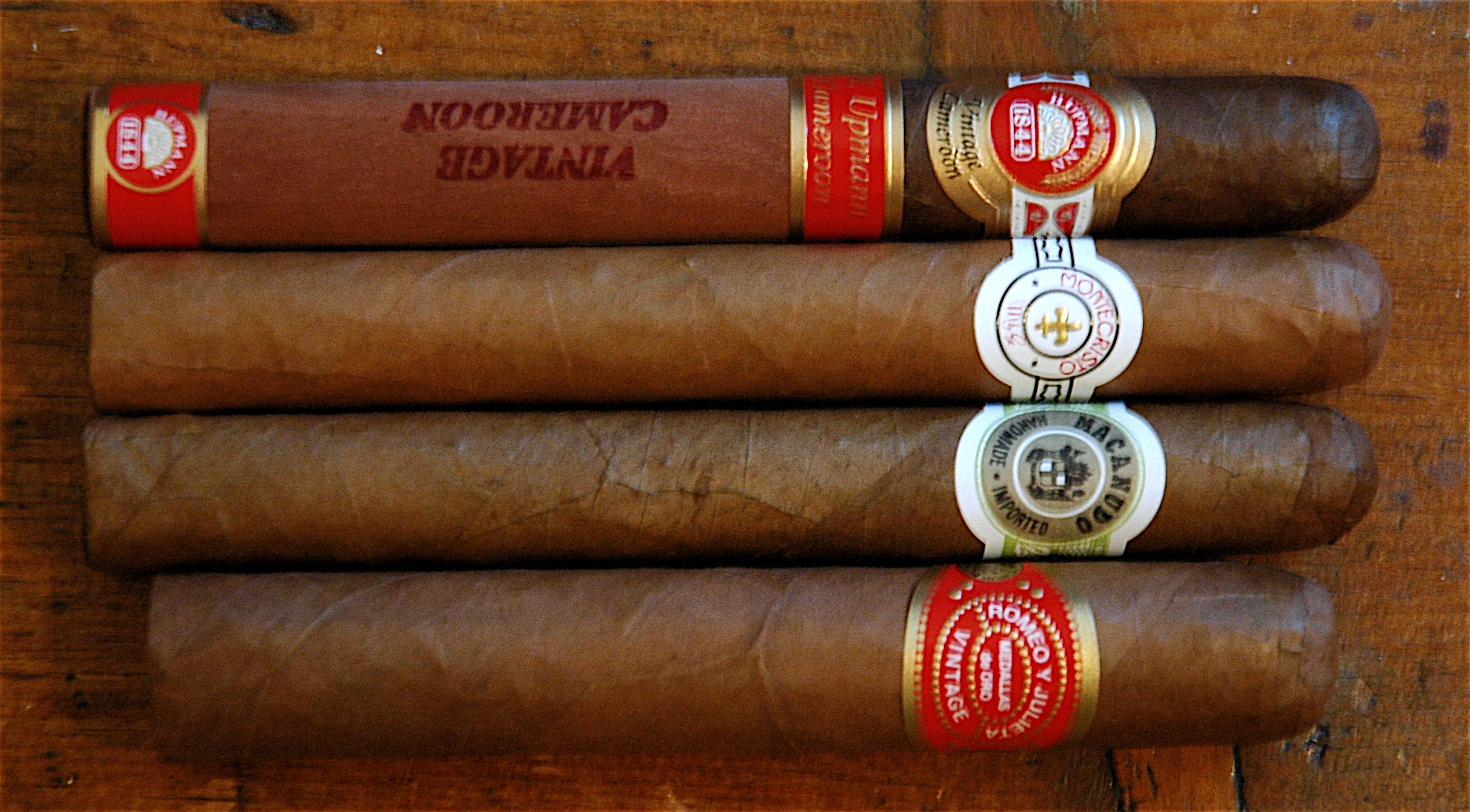
Cigars (top to bottom) by H. Upmann, Montecristo, Macanudo, Romeo y Julieta

Two firms dominate the cigar industry, Altadis and the Scandinavian Tobacco Group.

Altadis, a Spanish-owned private concern, produces cigars in the US, the Dominican Republic, and Honduras, and owns a 50% stake in Corporación Habanos S.A., the state owned national Cuban tobacco company. It also makes cigarettes. The Scandinavian Tobacco Group produces cigars in the Dominican Republic, Honduras, Nicaragua, Indonesia, the Netherlands, Belgium, Denmark and the United States; it also makes pipe tobacco and fine cut tobacco. The Group includes General Cigar Co.

The town of Tamboril in Santiago, Dominican Republic is considered by many as today's "Cigar Capital of the World" housing more cigar factories and rollers than anywhere else in the world. According to Cigar Aficionado magazine, 44% of the world's most traded cigars come from the Dominican Republic, the world's largest producer of cigars, especially from the fertile lands of the Cibao capital, where 90% of the factories are located. The area has also been the largest supplier of cigars to the US in the last decades.

=== Families in the cigar industry ===
Nearly all modern premium cigar makers are members of long-established cigar families, or purport to be, most originally rooted in the historic Cuban cigar industry. The art and skill of hand-making premium cigars has been passed from generation to generation. Families are often shown in many cigar advertisements and packaging.

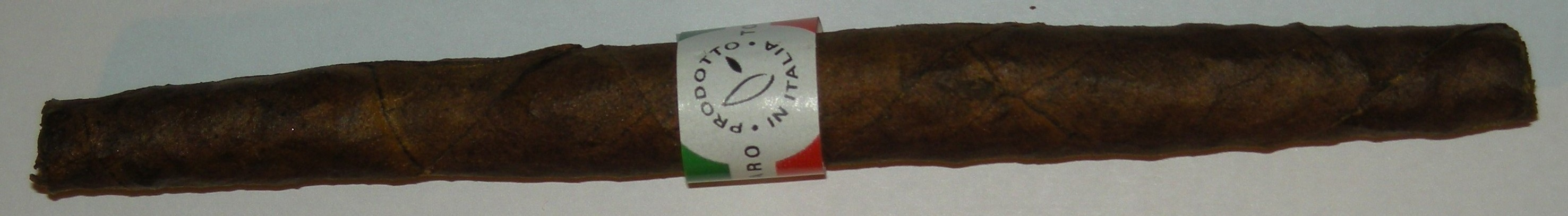
A Tuscan cigar

In 1992, Cigar Aficionado magazine created the "Cigar Hall of Fame" and recognized the following six individuals:

- Edgar M. Cullman, Chairman, General Cigar Company, New York, United States
- Zino Davidoff, Founder, Davidoff et Cie., Geneva, Switzerland
- Carlos Fuente Sr., Chairman, Tabacalera A. Fuente y Cia., Santiago de los Caballeros, Dominican Republic
- Frank Llaneza, Chairman, Villazon & Co., Tampa, Florida, United States
- Stanford J. Newman, Chairman, J.C. Newman Cigar Company, Tampa, Florida, United States
- Ángel Oliva Sr. (founder); Oliva Tobacco Co., Tampa, Florida, United States

==== Other families in the cigar industry (2015) ====
- Manuel Quesada (MATASA Current CEO) Fonseca, Casa Magna, Quesada cigars, Dominican Republic
- Don José "Pepín" Garcia, Chairman, El Rey de Los Habanos, Miami, Florida, United States
- Aray Family – Daniel Aray Jr, Grandson of Founder (1952) Jose Aray, ACC Cigars, Guayaquil Ecuador, San Francisco, CA, Miami Florida, Macau SAR, Shanghai China.
- EPC – Ernesto Perez-Carillo, Founder EPC Cigar Company (2009), Miami, Florida, United States
- Nestor Miranda – Founder, Miami Cigar Company (1989) Miami, FL, United States
- Blanco family – Jose "Jochy" Blanco, son of Founder (1936) Jose Arnaldo Blanco Polanco, Tabacalera La Palma, Santiago, Dominican Republic
- Hermann Dietrich Upmann, founder of the H. Upmann brand 1844 in Cuba

== Marketing and distribution ==
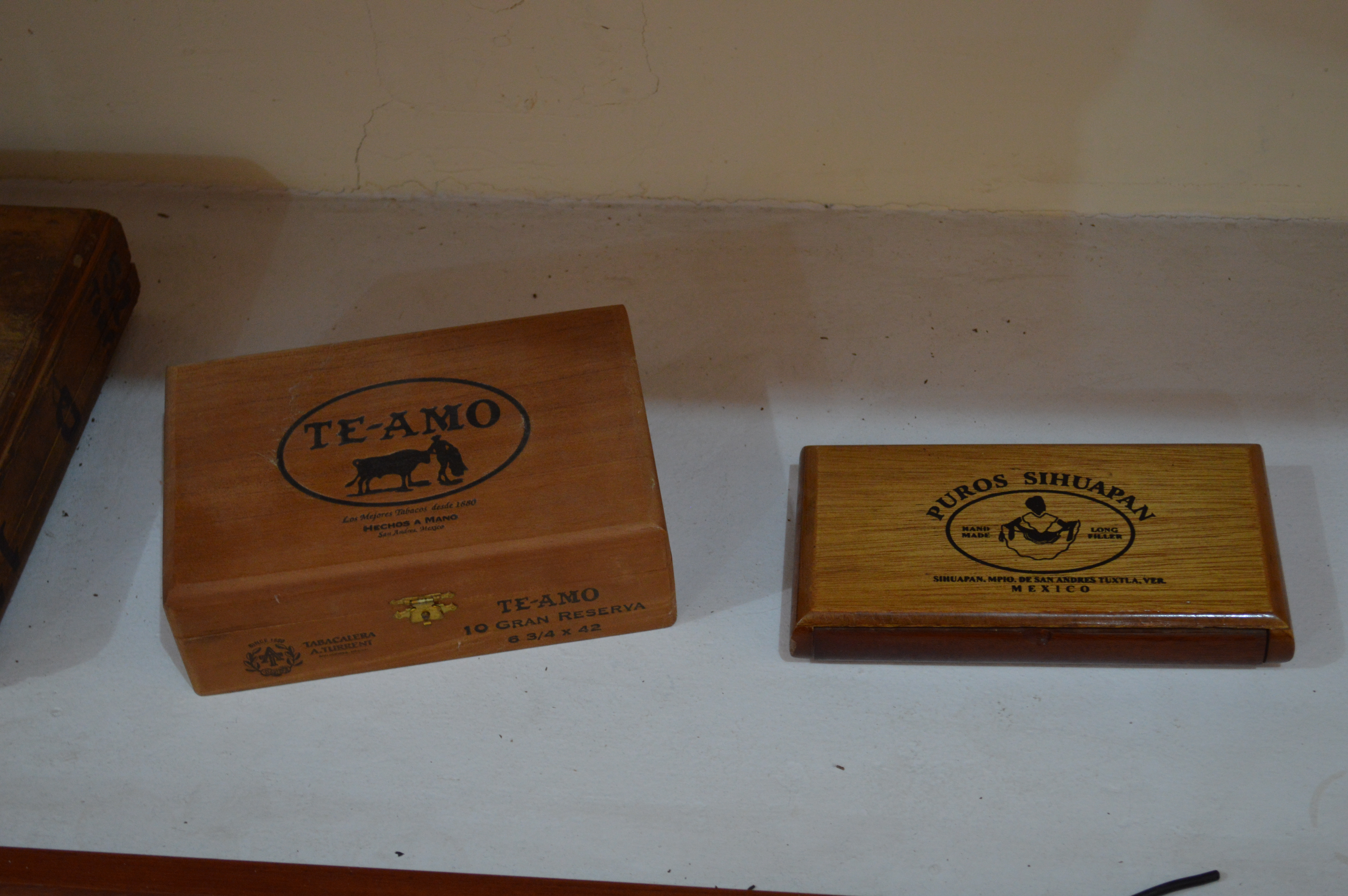
Cigar cases from the Te Amo and Sihuapan manufacturers in Mexico

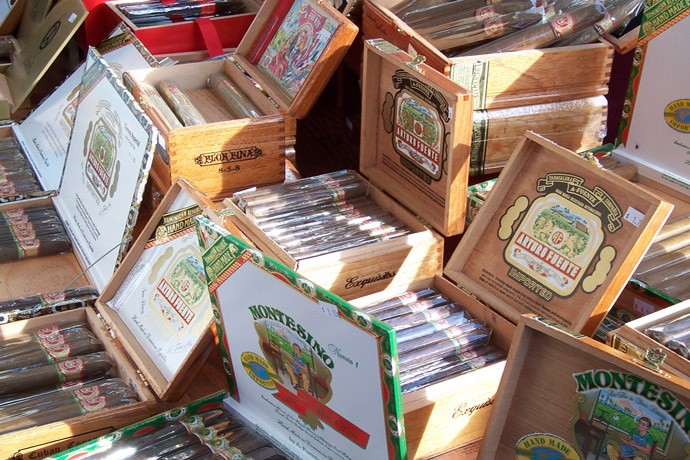
Arturo Fuente cigar boxes at 2005 Tampa Cigar Heritage Festival. The Montesino cigars are also produced by Tabacalera A. Fuente y Cia.

Pure tobacco, hand rolled cigars are marketed via advertisements, product placement in movies and other media, sporting events, cigar-friendly magazines such as Cigar Aficionado, and cigar dinners. Since handmade cigars are a premium product with a hefty price, advertisements often include depictions of affluence, sensual imagery, and explicit or implied celebrity endorsement.

Cigar Aficionado, launched in 1992, presents cigars as symbols of a successful lifestyle, and is a major conduit of advertisements that do not conform to the tobacco industry's voluntary advertisement restrictions since 1965, such as a restriction not to associate smoking with glamour. The magazine also presents pro-smoking arguments at length, and argues that cigars are safer than cigarettes, since they do not have the thousands of chemical additives that cigarette manufactures add to the cutting floor scraps of tobacco used as cigarette filler. The publication also presents arguments that risks are a part of daily life and that (contrary to the evidence discussed in Health effects) cigar smoking has health benefits, that moderation eliminates most or all health risk, and that cigar smokers live to old age, that health research is flawed, and that several health-research results support claims of safety. Like its competitor Smoke, Cigar Aficionado differs from marketing vehicles used for other tobacco products in that it makes cigars the main (but not sole) focus of the magazine, creating a symbiosis between product and lifestyle.

In the US, cigars have historically been exempt from many of the marketing regulations that govern cigarettes. For example, the Public Health Cigarette Smoking Act of 1970 exempted cigars from its advertising ban, and cigar ads, unlike cigarette ads, need not mention health risks. As of 2007, cigars were taxed far less than cigarettes, so much so that in many US states, a pack of little cigars cost less than half as much as a pack of cigarettes. It is illegal for minors to purchase cigars and other tobacco products in the US, but laws are unevenly enforced: a 2000 study found that three-quarters of web cigar sites allowed minors to purchase them.

In 2009, the US Family Smoking Prevention and Tobacco Control Act provided the Food and Drug Administration regulatory authority over the manufacturing, distribution, and marketing of cigarettes, roll-your-own tobacco and smokeless tobacco. In 2016, a deeming rule extended the FDA's authority to additional tobacco products including cigars, e-cigarettes and hookah. The objective of the law is to reduce the impact of tobacco on public health by preventing Americans from starting to use tobacco products, encourage current users to quit, and decrease the harms of tobacco product use.

In the US, inexpensive cigars are sold in convenience stores, gas stations, grocery stores, and pharmacies. Premium cigars are sold in tobacconists, cigar bars, and other specialized establishments. Some cigar stores are part of chains, which have varied in size: in the US, United Cigar Stores was one of only three outstanding examples of national chains in the early 1920s, the others being A&P and Woolworth's. Non-traditional outlets for cigars include hotel shops, restaurants, vending machines and the Internet.

== Composition ==
Cigars are composed of three types of tobacco leaves, whose variations determine smoking and flavor characteristics:

=== Wrapper ===
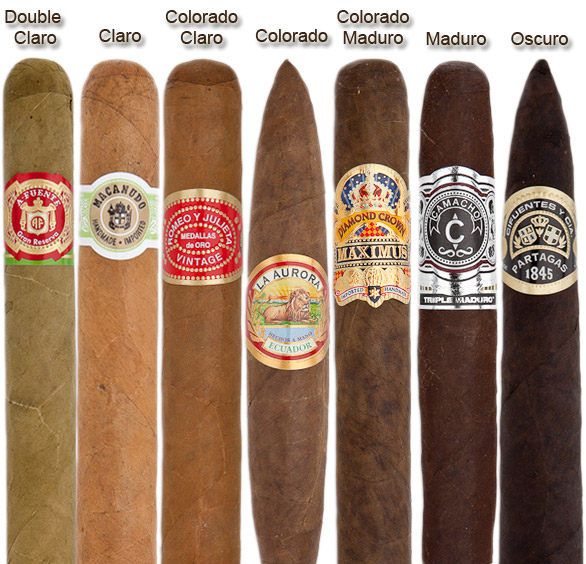
Darker wrappers reflect tobacco type, age, and greater fermentation

A cigar's outermost layer, or wrapper (Spanish: capa), is the most expensive component of a cigar. The wrapper determines much of the cigar's character and flavor, and as such its color is often used to describe the cigar as a whole. Wrappers are frequently grown underneath huge canopies made of gauze so as to diffuse direct sunlight and are fermented separately from other rougher cigar components, with a view to the production of a thinly-veined, smooth, supple leaf.

Wrapper tobacco produced without the gauze canopies under which "shade grown" leaf is grown, generally more coarse in texture and stronger in flavor, is commonly known as "sun grown". A number of different countries are used for the production of wrapper tobacco, including Cuba, Ecuador, Indonesia, Honduras, Nicaragua, Costa Rica, Brazil, Mexico, Cameroon, and the United States.

While dozens of minor wrapper shades have been touted by manufacturers, the seven most common classifications are as follows, ranging from lightest to darkest:

| Color | Description |
|---|---|
| Candela ("Double Claro") | very light, slightly greenish. Achieved by picking leaves before maturity and drying quickly, the color coming from retained green chlorophyll. |
| Claro | very light tan or yellowish |
| Colorado Claro | medium brown |
| Colorado ("Rosado") | reddish-brown |
| Colorado Maduro | darker brown |
| Maduro | very dark brown |
| Oscuro ("Double Maduro") | black |

Some manufacturers use an alternate designation:

| Designation | Acronym | Description |
|---|---|---|
| American Market Selection | AMS | synonymous with Candela ("Double Claro") |
| English Market Selection | EMS | any natural colored wrapper which is darker than Candela, but lighter than Maduro |
| Spanish Market Selection | SMS | one of the two darkest colors, Maduro or Oscuro |

In general, dark wrappers add a touch of sweetness, while light ones add a hint of dryness to the taste.

=== Binder ===
Beneath the wrapper is a small bunch of "filler" leaves bound together inside of a leaf called a "binder" (Spanish: capote). The binder leaf is typically the sun-saturated leaf from the top part of a tobacco plant and is selected for its elasticity and durability in the rolling process. Unlike the wrapper leaf, which must be uniform in appearance and smooth in texture, the binder leaf may show evidence of physical blemishes or lack uniform coloration. The binder leaf is generally thicker and hardier than the wrapper leaf surrounding it.

=== Filler ===
Long-leaf filler as used in a hand-rolled cigar (slightly crumbled during cutting)

The bulk of a cigar is "filler"—a bound bunch of tobacco leaves. These leaves are folded by hand to allow air passageways down the length of the cigar, through which smoke is drawn after the cigar is lit. A cigar rolled with insufficient air passage is referred to by a smoker as "too tight"; one with excessive airflow creating an excessively fast, hot burn is regarded as "too loose". Considerable skill and dexterity on the part of the cigar roller is needed to avoid these opposing pitfalls—a primary factor in the superiority of hand-rolled cigars over their machine-made counterparts.

By blending various varieties of filler tobacco, cigar makers create distinctive strength, aroma, and flavor profiles for their various branded products. In general, fatter cigars hold more filler leaves, allowing a greater potential for the creation of complex flavors. In addition to the variety of tobacco employed, the country of origin can be one important determinant of taste, with different growing environments producing distinctive flavors.

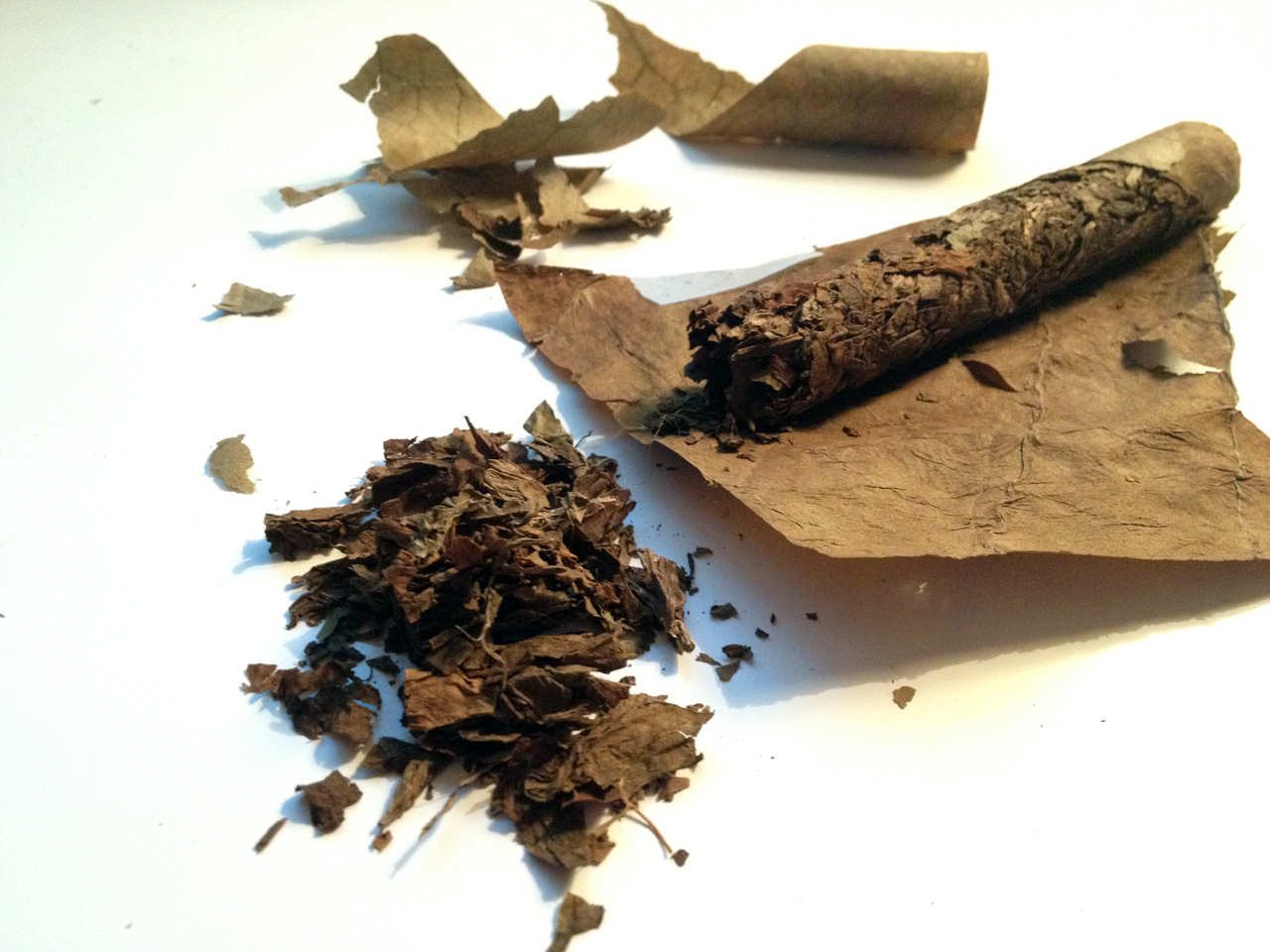
Short or chopped filler

The fermentation and aging process adds to this variety, as does the particular part of the tobacco plant harvested, with bottom leaves (Spanish: volado) having a mild flavor and burning easily, middle leaves (Spanish: seco) having a somewhat stronger flavor, with potent and spicy ligero leaves taken from the sun-drenched top of the plant. When used, ligero is always folded into the middle of the filler bunch due to its slow-burning characteristics.

Some cigar manufacturers purposely place different types of tobacco from one end to the other to give the cigar smokers a variety of tastes, body, and strength from start to finish.

If full leaves are used as filler, a cigar is said to be composed of "long filler". Cigars made from smaller bits of leaf, including many machine-made cigars, are said to be made of "short filler".

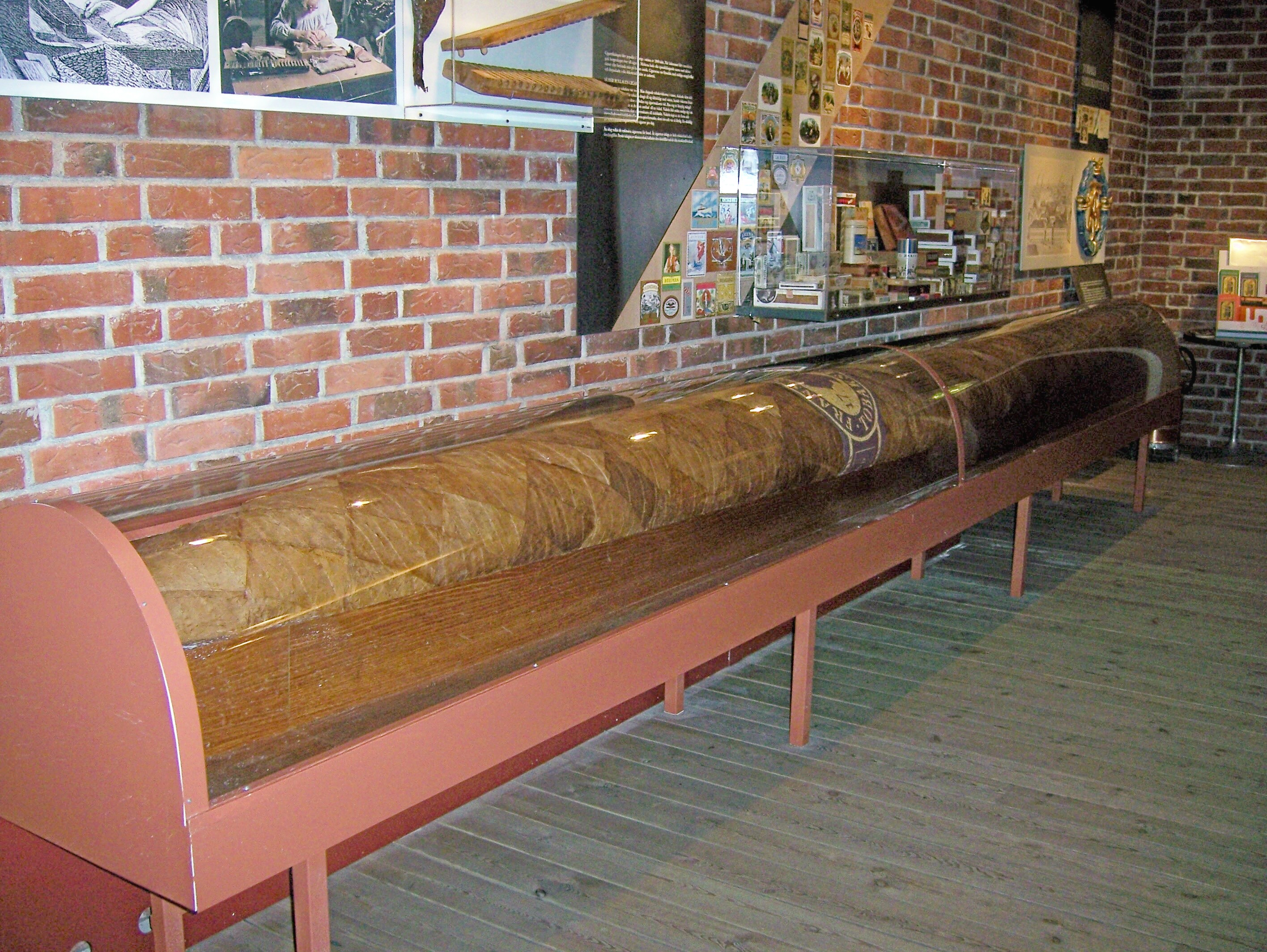
World's largest cigar at the Tobacco and Matchstick Museum in Skansen, Stockholm, Sweden

If a cigar is completely constructed (filler, binder, and wrapper) of tobacco produced in only one country, it is referred to in the cigar industry as a "puro", from the Spanish word for "pure".

== Size and shape ==
Cigars are commonly categorized by their size and shape, which together are known as the vitola.

The size of a cigar is measured by two dimensions: its ring gauge (its diameter in sixty-fourths of an inch) and its length (in inches). In Cuba, next to Havana, there is a display of the world's longest rolled cigars.

=== Parejo ===
The most common shape is the parejo, sometimes referred to as simply "coronas", which have traditionally been the benchmark against which all other cigar formats are measured. They have a cylindrical shape their entire length, one end open, and a round tobacco-leaf "cap" on the other end that must be sliced off, notched, or pierced before smoking.

Parejos are designated by the following terms:

| Term | Length in inches | Width in 64ths of an inch | Metric length | Metric width | Etymology |
|---|---|---|---|---|---|
| Cigarillo | ~ 3 1/2 | ~ 21 | ~ 8 cm | ~ 8 mm | Sizes may vary significantly. According to CigarCyclopedia, cigarillo is shorter than 6 inches (15 cm) and thinner than 29 ring gauge (11.5 mm). |
| Rothschild | 4 1/2 | 48 | 11 cm | 19 mm | after the Rothschild family |
| Robolo | 4 1/2 | 60 | 11 cm | 24 mm | |
| Robusto | 4 7/8 | 50 | 12 cm | 20 mm | The Spanish word "Robusto" translates to "strong" or "robust." |
| Small Panatela | 5 | 33 | 13 cm | 13 mm | |
| Ascot | 4 1/2 | 24 | 11 cm | 13 mm | |
| Petit Corona | 5 1/8 | 42 | 13 cm | 17 mm | |
| Carlota | 5 5/8 | 35 | 14 cm | 14 mm | |
| Corona | 5 1/2 | 42 | 14 cm | 17 mm | Spanish translates to "crown". Various theories abound as to why, from the amount of tobacco being used costing one "corona" (the Spanish unit of money then), to being (crowned) the "best" vitola, to being a royal standard in Spain. |
| Corona Gorda | 5 5/8 | 46 | 14 cm | 18 mm | Spanish translates to "large crown" |
| Panatela | 6 | 38 | 15 cm | 15 mm | |
| Toro | 6 | 50 | 15 cm | 20 mm | Spanish translates to "bull" |
| Corona Grande | 6 1/8 | 42 | 16 cm | 17 mm | |
| Lonsdale | 6 1/2 | 42 | 17 cm | 17 mm | named for Hugh Cecil Lowther, 5th Earl of Lonsdale |
| Churchill | 7 | 47–50 | 18 cm | 19–20 mm | named for Sir Winston Churchill |
| Double Corona | 7 5/8 | 49 | 19 cm | 19 mm | Named for using twice as much tobacco as a corona |
| Presidente | 8 | 50 | 20 cm | 20 mm | |
| Gran Corona | 9 1/4 | 47 | 23 cm | 19 mm | |
| Double Toro/Gordo | 6 | 60 | 15 cm | 24 mm | |

These dimensions are, at best, idealized. Actual dimensions can vary considerably.

=== Figurado ===
The parejo is the easiest and least expensive common cigar shape to produce

Irregularly shaped cigars are known as figurados and are often priced higher than generally similar sized parejos of a like combination of tobaccos because they are more difficult to make.

Historically, especially during the 19th century, figurados were the most popular shapes, but by the 1930s they had fallen out of fashion and all but disappeared. They have recently received a small resurgence in popularity, and currently many manufacturers produce figurados alongside the simpler parejos. The Cuban cigar brand Cuaba only has figurados in their range.

Figurados include the following:

| Figurado | Description |
|---|---|
| Torpedo | Like a parejo except that the cap is pointed |
| Cheroot | Like a parejo except that there is no cap, i.e. both ends are open |
| Pyramid | Has a broad foot and evenly narrows to a pointed cap |
| Perfecto | Narrow at both ends and bulged in the middle |
| Presidente/Diadema | shaped like a parejo, but considered a figurado because of its enormous size and occasional closed foot akin to a perfecto |
| Culebras | Three long, pointed cigars braided together |
| Chisel | Is much like the Torpedo, but instead of coming to a rounded point, comes to a flatter, broader edge, much like an actual chisel. This shape was patented and can only be found in the La Flor Dominicana (LFD) brand |

In practice, the terms Torpedo and Pyramid are often used interchangeably, even among knowledgeable cigar smokers. Min Ron Nee, the Hong Kong-based cigar expert whose work An Illustrated Encyclopaedia of Post-Revolution Havana Cigars is generally considered to be the definitive work on cigars and cigar terms, defines Torpedo as "cigar slang". Nee regards the majority usage of torpedoes as pyramids by another name as acceptable.

Arturo Fuente, a large cigar manufacturer based in the Dominican Republic, has also manufactured figurados in exotic shapes ranging from chili peppers to baseball bats and American footballs. They are highly collectible and extremely expensive, when available to the public.

=== Cigarillo ===
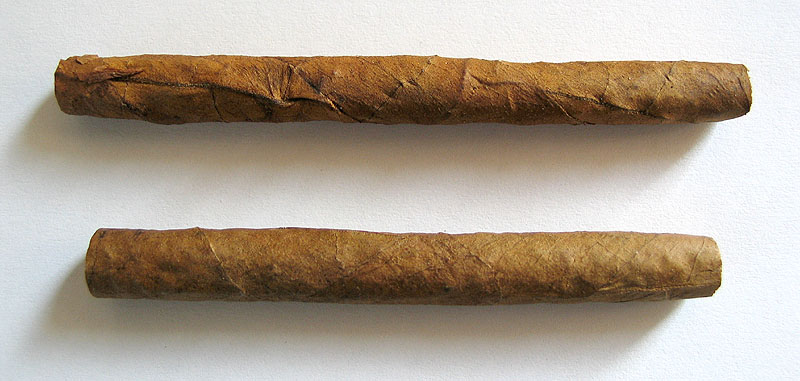
Cohiba Mini and Dannemann Moods cigarillos

A cigarillo is a machine-made cigar that is shorter and narrower than a traditional cigar but larger than little cigars, filtered cigars, and cigarettes, thus similar in size and composition to small panatela sized cigars, cheroots, and traditional blunts. Cigarillos are usually not filtered, although some have plastic or wood tips, and unlike other cigars, some are inhaled when used. Cigarillos are sold in varying quantities: singles, two-packs, three-packs, and five-packs. Cigarillos are very inexpensive: in the United States, usually sold for less than a dollar. Sometimes they are informally called small cigars, mini cigars, or club cigars. Some famous cigar brands, such as Cohiba or Davidoff, also make cigarillos—Cohiba Mini and Davidoff Club Cigarillos, for example. And there are purely cigarillo brands, such as Café Crème, Dannemann Moods, Mehari's, Al Capone, and Swisher Sweets. Cigarillos are often used in making marijuana cigars.

=== Little cigars ===
Little cigars (sometimes called small cigars or miniatures in the UK) differ greatly from regular cigars. They weigh less than cigars and cigarillos, but, more importantly, they resemble cigarettes in size, shape, packaging, and filters. Sales of little cigars quadrupled in the US from 1971 to 1973 in response to the Public Health Cigarette Smoking Act, which banned the broadcast of cigarette advertisements and required stronger health warnings on cigarette packs. Cigars were exempt from the ban, and perhaps more importantly, were taxed at a far lower rate. Little cigars are sometimes called "cigarettes in disguise", and unsuccessful attempts have been made to reclassify them as cigarettes. In the US, sales of little cigars reached an all-time high in 2006, fueled in great part by favorable taxation. In some states, little cigars have successfully been taxed at the rate of cigarettes, such as Illinois, as well as other states. This has caused yet another loophole, in which manufacturers classify their products as "filtered cigars" instead to avoid the higher tax rate. Yet, many continue to argue that there is in fact a distinction between little cigars and filtered cigars. Little cigars offer a similar draw and overall feel to cigarettes, but with aged and fermented tobaccos, while filtered cigars are said to be more closely related to traditional cigars, and are not meant to be inhaled. Research shows that people do inhale smoke from little cigars.

==== Cannagar ====
Recently, with the changing legality of cannabis, some suppliers are creating so-called "cannagars" (a portmanteau of "cannabis" and "cigar"). These are different from cannabis blunts. Modeled after a traditional cigar, a cannagar is cannabis wrapped within either cannabis or hemp leaf, like a traditional cigar is tobacco wrapped inside dried tobacco leaf. Unlike a cigar, cannagars do not usually contain tobacco, but they do need to be cut and lit like a cigar.

== Smoking ==
A double guillotine-style cutter, used for cutting the tip of a cigar, next to a hand-rolled H. Upmann Coronas Major cigar. The "Made in Cuba" label (see Cuban cigar) is visible on the lower tube.

Most machine-made cigars have pre-formed holes in one end or a wood or plastic tip for drawing in the smoke. Hand-rolled cigars require the blunt end to be pierced before lighting. The usual way to smoke a cigar is to not inhale, but to draw the smoke into the mouth. Some smokers inhale the smoke into the lungs, particularly with little cigars. A smoker may swirl the smoke around in the mouth before exhaling it, and may exhale part of the smoke through the nose in order to smell the cigar better as well as to taste it.

=== Cutting ===
Although a handful of cigars are cut or twirled on both ends, the vast majority come with one straight cut end and the other capped with one or more small pieces of wrapper adhered with either a natural tobacco paste or with a mixture of flour and water. The cap end of a cigar must be cut or pierced for the cigar smoke to be drawn properly.

The basic types of cigar cutter include:

- Guillotine (straight cut)
- Punch
- V-cut (a.k.a. notch cut, cat's eye, wedge cut, English cut)
- Grip cutters
- Cigar Scissors

=== Lighting ===
The head, or cap, of the cigar is usually the end closest to the cigar band, the other the "foot". The band identifies the type of the cigar and may be removed or left on. The smoker cuts or pierces the cap before lighting.

The cigar should be held at a 45-degree angle and rotated during lighting to achieve an even burn while slowly drawn with gentle puffs. If a match is used it should be allowed to burn past its head before being put to the cigar, to avoid imparting unwelcome flavors or chemicals to the smoke. Many specialized gas and fluid lighters are made for lighting cigars. The tip of the cigar should minimally touch any flame, with special care used with torch lighters to avoid charring the tobacco leaves.

A third and most traditional way to light a cigar is to use a splinter of cedar known as a spill, which is lit separately before using. Some cigars come individually wrapped in thin cedar sleeves or envelopes, and these can be used to assist in lighting them.

=== Flavor ===
Each brand and type of cigar has its unique taste. Whether a cigar is mild, medium, or full bodied does not correlate with quality.

Among the factors which contribute to the scent and flavor of cigar smoke are tobacco types and qualities used for filler, binder, and wrapper, age and aging method, humidity, production techniques (handmade vs. machine-made), and added flavors. Among wrappers, darker tend to produce a sweetness, while lighter usually have a "drier", more neutral taste.

The priming of tobacco refers to the position of the leaves on the tobacco plant when they are harvested, and it has a major impact on a cigar's flavor and strength. Lower primings—like volado—burn easily and offer a milder, more delicate flavor, making them ideal for combustion. Mid-level leaves—seco—contribute balanced flavor and aroma. Upper primings—ligero—receive the most sunlight and nutrients, resulting in thicker leaves with more strength, body, and intensity. Master blenders use a mix of these primings to create complexity and balance in a cigar, tailoring the smoking experience from smooth and subtle to bold and powerful.

Just like in wine, terroir—the unique combination of soil, climate, altitude, and farming practices—plays a critical role in shaping the flavor of premium cigars. Tobacco grown in different regions can produce vastly different characteristics; Nicaraguan tobacco often delivers bold, spicy notes due to its volcanic soil, while Dominican tobacco tends to offer a smoother, more refined profile. Even small changes in elevation or rainfall can influence a leaf's texture, strength, and aroma. This connection to the land is what gives each cigar its distinctive identity, much like the nuances found in wines from different vineyards.

Evaluating the flavor of cigars is in some respects similar to wine-tasting. Journals are available for recording personal ratings, description of flavors observed, sizes, brands, etc. Some words used to describe cigar flavor and texture include; spicy, peppery (red or black), sweet, harsh, burnt, green, earthy, woody, cocoa, chestnut, roasted, aged, nutty, creamy, cedar, oak, chewy, fruity, and leathery.

=== Smoke ===
Smoke is produced by incomplete combustion of tobacco during which at least three kinds of chemical reactions occur: pyrolysis breaks down organic molecules into simpler ones, pyrosynthesis recombines these newly formed fragments into chemicals not originally present, and distillation moves compounds such as nicotine from the tobacco into the smoke. For every gram of tobacco smoked, a cigar emits about 120–140 mg of carbon dioxide, 40–60 mg of carbon monoxide, 3–4 mg of isoprene, 1 mg each of hydrogen cyanide and acetaldehyde, and smaller quantities of a large spectrum of volatile N-nitrosamines and volatile organic compounds, with the detailed composition unknown.

The most odorous chemicals in cigar smoke are pyridines. Along with pyrazines, they are also the most odorous chemicals in cigar smokers' breath. These substances are noticeable even at extremely low concentrations of a few parts per billion. During smoking, it is not known whether these chemicals are generated by splitting the chemical bonds of nicotine or by Maillard reaction between amino acids and sugars in the tobacco.

Cigar smoke is more alkaline than cigarette smoke, and is absorbed more readily by the mucous membrane of the mouth, making it easier for the smoker to absorb nicotine without having to inhale. A single premium cigar may contain as much nicotine as a pack of cigarettes.

== Parasites ==
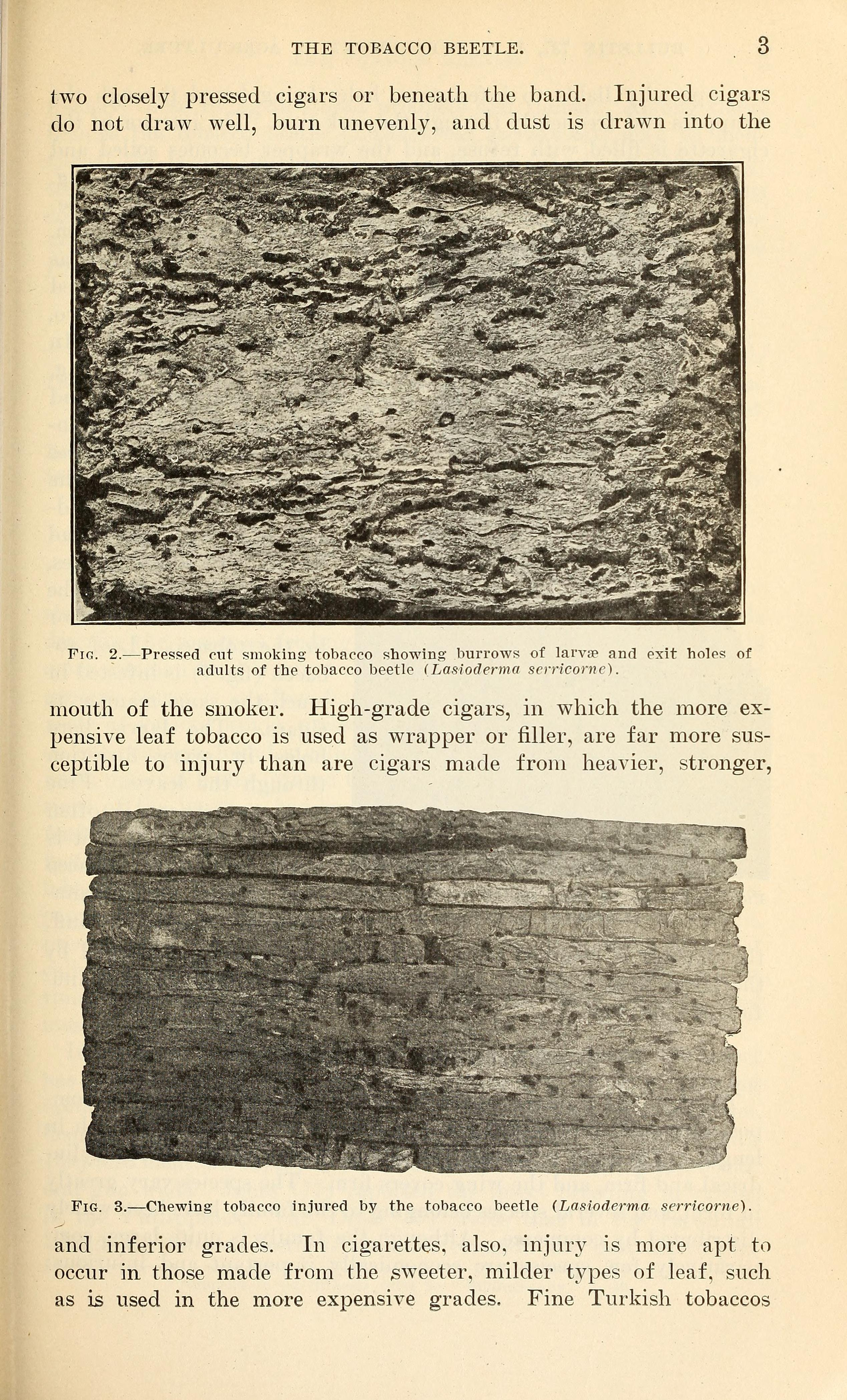
Illustration with photographs of tobacco leaves infested by Lasioderma serricorne (tobacco beetles), from Runner, G. A., The tobacco beetle (1919), Bulletin of the U.S. Department of Agriculture, Biodiversity Heritage Library

Cigars, alongside other tobacco products, can be infested by parasites such as the Lasioderma serricorne (tobacco beetle) and the Ephestia elutella (tobacco moth), which are the most widespread and damaging parasites to the tobacco industry. Infestation can range from the tobacco cultivated in the fields to the leaves used for manufacturing cigars, cigarillos, cigarettes, etc. Both the larvae of Lasioderma serricorne and caterpillars of Ephestia elutella are considered a pest.

== Humidors ==
The level of humidity in which cigars are stored has a significant effect on their taste and evenness of burn. Most cigars stay in good condition when kept at about 65-70% relative humidity and a temperature of 64 to 70 F (18 to 21 C). Dry cigars become fragile and burn faster while damp cigars burn unevenly and take on a heavy acidic flavor. Humidors are used to maintain an even humidity level. Without one, cigars will lose moisture and acquire the ambient humidity within 2 to 3 days. A humidor's interior lining is typically constructed with three types of wood: Spanish cedar, American (or Canadian) red cedar, and Honduran mahogany. Other materials used for making or lining a humidor are acrylic, tin (mainly seen in older early humidors) and copper, used widely in the 1920s–1950s.

Most humidors come with a plastic or metal case with a sponge that works as the humidifier, although most recent versions are of polymer acryl. The latter are filled only with distilled water; the former may use a solution of propylene glycol and distilled water. Humidifiers, and the cigars within them, may become contaminated with bacteria if they are kept too moist. New technologies employing plastic beads or gels which stabilize humidity are becoming widely available.

A new humidor requires seasoning, after which a constant humidity must be maintained. The thicker the cedar lining the better. Many humidors contain an analog or digital hygrometer to aid in maintaining a desired humidity level. There are three types of analog: metal spring, natural hair, and synthetic hair.

In recent times Electric Humidors, which feature a thermoelectric humidification system have become popular for larger cigar collections.

== Accessories ==
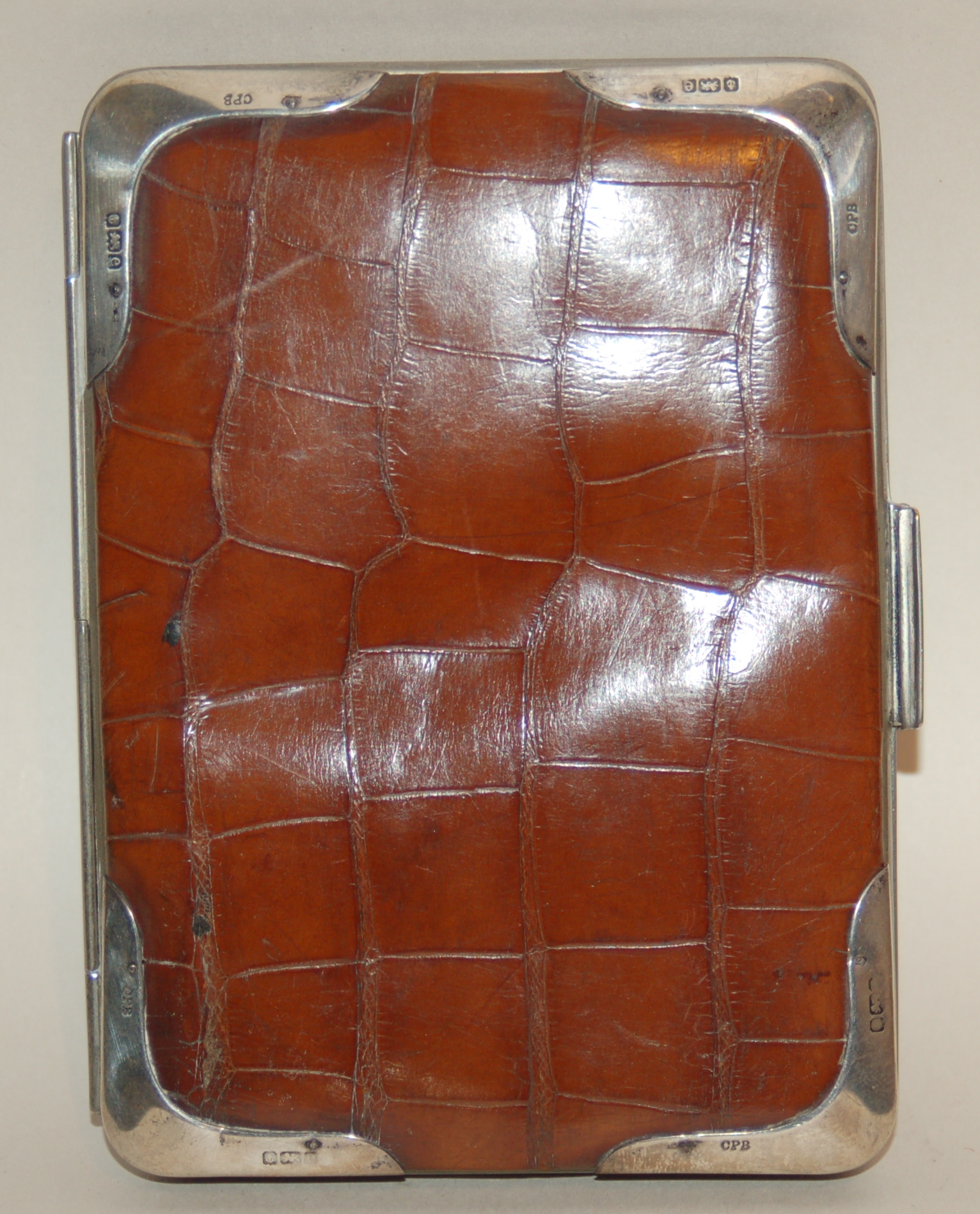
A cigar case made of crocodile skin with sterling silver appointments bearing a Birmingham hallmark for 1904

A wide variety of cigar accessories are available, in varying qualities.

=== Tube ===
Cigar tubes are used to carry small numbers of cigars, typically one or five, referred to by their number of "fingers". They are usually made from stainless steel, and used for short durations. For longer, a built in humidifier and hygrometer is used.

=== Ashtray ===
Ashtrays are used for collecting the ash produced by the cigar. Such ashtrays are typically larger than those used for cigarette smoking.

=== Holder ===
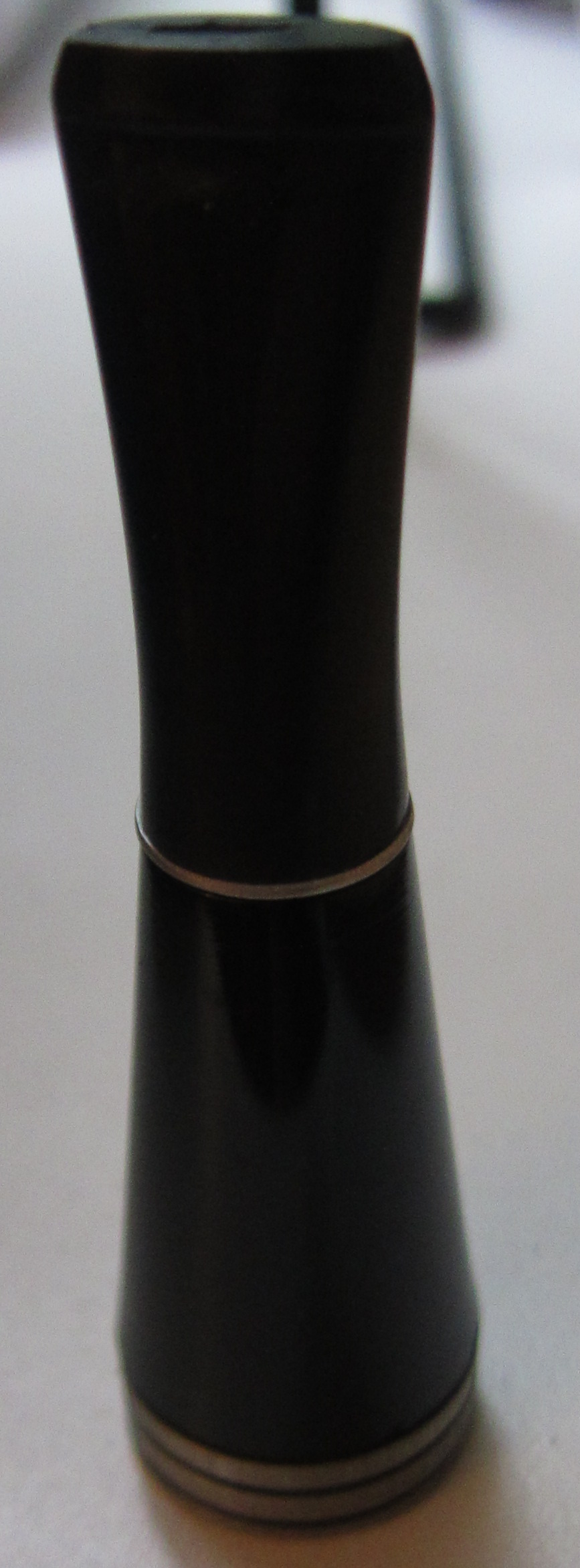
A cigar holder stood on end

A cigar holder is a small tube in which the end of the cigar is held while smoked, to protect the hand from acquiring the odor of a burning cigar, historically used by women (for cigarettes as well). A cigar stand is a device used to keep a lit cigar out of an ashtray.

== Health effects ==
Like other forms of tobacco use, cigar smoking poses a significant health risk depending on dosage: risks are greater for those who smoke more cigars, smoke them longer, or inhale more. A review of 22 studies found that cigar smoking is associated with lung cancer, oral cancer, esophageal cancer, pancreatic cancer, oropharyngeal cancer, laryngeal cancer, coronary heart disease (CHD), and aortic aneurysm. Among cigar smokers who reported that they did not inhale, relative mortality (likelihood of death) risk was still highly elevated for oral, esophageal, and laryngeal cancers.

Danger of mortality increases proportionally to use, with smokers of one to two cigars per day showing a 2% increase in death rate, compared to non-smokers. The precise statistical health risks to those who smoke less than daily are not established.

The depth of inhalation of cigar smoke into the lungs appears to be an important determinant of lung cancer risk:

When cigar smokers don't inhale or smoke few cigars per day, the risks are only slightly above those of never smokers. Risks of lung cancer increase with increasing inhalation and with increasing number of cigars smoked per day, but the effect of inhalation is more powerful than that for number of cigars per day. When 5 or more cigars are smoked per day and there is moderate inhalation, the lung cancer risks of cigar smoking approximate those of a one pack per day cigarette smoker. As the tobacco smoke exposure of the lung in cigar smokers increases to approximate the frequency of smoking and depth of inhalation found in cigarette smokers, the difference in lung cancer risks produced by these two behaviors disappears.

Cigar smoking can lead to nicotine addiction and cigarette usage. For those who inhale and smoke several cigars a day, the health risk is similar to cigarette smokers. Cigar smoking can also increase the risk of chronic obstructive pulmonary disease (COPD).

So-called "little cigars" are commonly inhaled and likely pose the same health risks as cigarettes, while premium cigars are not commonly inhaled or habitually used.

== Popularity ==
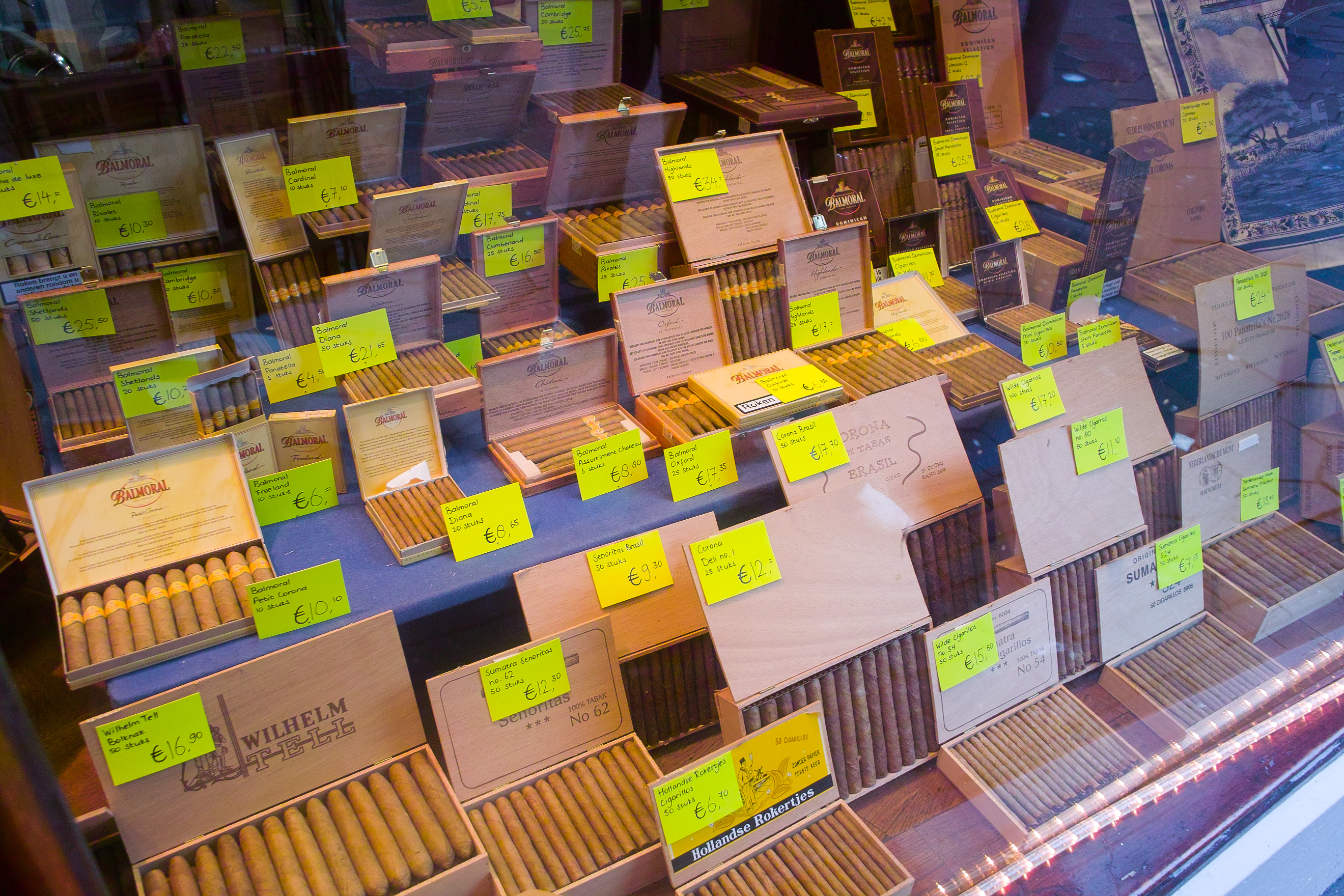
Display of various cigar cases with prices in a cigar store in Amsterdam, Netherlands

The prevalence of cigar smoking varies depending on location, historical period, and population surveyed. The United States is the top consuming country by total sales by a considerable margin, followed by Germany and the United Kingdom. The U.S. and Western European countries account for about 75% of cigar sales worldwide.

=== United States ===
Consumption of cigars in the U.S. rose from 6.2 billion in 2000 to the peak of an enormous "cigar boom" of 13.8 billion in 2012, which had receded to 11.4 billion by 2015.

Among US adults ages 18 and older, 3% reported that they smoke cigars some days or every day (6% of men, 1% of women) in the 2015 National Health Interview Survey.

Cigar use among youth declined sharply from 12% reporting having smoked a cigar within the past 30 days approaching the peak of the cigar boom in 2011 to 8% by 2016. Among high school students, cigar use is more common among males (10%) than females (6%). For African American high school students, cigar use is more prevalent (10%) than cigarette use (4%).

== In popular culture ==
In a reversal of previous decades' portrayal, beginning in the 1980s and 1990s major American print media began to feature cigars favorably. Cigar use was generally framed as a lucrative business or trendy habit, rather than as a major health risk. It is an item whose highest quality is still something most can afford, at least for special occasions. Historic portrayals of the wealthy often caricatured cigar smokers as wearing top hats and tailcoats. Cigars are often given out and smoked to celebrate special occasions, such as the birth of a baby, but also graduations, promotions, and other totems of success. The expression "close but no cigar" comes from the practice of giving away cigars as prizes in fairground games which require the player to hit a target (e.g., a bullseye).

== See also ==
- Box-pressed
- Cigar ash
- Cigar etiquette
- Cigar makers strike of 1877
- Cigarette
- Cigarillo
- List of cigar brands
- Smoking jacket
