= Cigar etiquette =

Politeness while smoking a cigar

Cigar etiquette is polite behaviour when smoking a cigar. For example, in 19th century Havana, it was considered an insult to give another smoker a light from your cigar without first knocking off the ash from the cigar.

== Zino Davidoff ==
Rules of cigar etiquette were published in 1967 by Swiss tobacconist Zino Davidoff in his essay entitled "Zino Davidoff's Guide to Cigar Etiquette." The essay calls for cigar aficionados to do such things as smoke the cigar only halfway, let it burn out on its own, never ask another smoker for a light, refrain from smoking while walking, etc. Davidoff dismisses the elaborate rituals of lighting, says that removing or leaving the band are equally correct, and insists that a gentleman never relights a cigar that is more than two-thirds smoked.

== Other rules of etiquette ==
A number of sets of rules of cigar etiquette besides Davidoff's have been compiled and published from time to time. These include:

=== New York Times ===
In a 2005 article in The New York Times, Harry Hurt III suggested four basic rules of cigar etiquette:

1. Confine indoor cigar smoking to cigar parlors.
2. Don't chain-smoke cigars.
3. Don't offend non-smokers with the smell of cigar smoke on your clothes or breath.
4. Don't ask, don't tell if it's a Cuban cigar.

=== Cigar Aficionado ===
Cigar Aficionado's book Cigar Companion suggests two sets of rules: one when among non-smokers, and another when among cigar smokers. One should never smoke except where smoking is appreciated, and care should be taken to minimize criticism from non-smokers from the smell of smoke in one's home or on one's clothes. Among other cigar smokers, it suggests rules governing sharing, cutting, lighting, humidors, women cigar smokers, and gifts. It concludes with one ironclad rule: never give a prank exploding cigar, and do not associate with anyone who does.

=== General smoking etiquette ===
Emily post's Etiquette presents a number of rules for smokers in general, as well as to the hosts of smoking guests. Among which it stated that cigars should be passed around "only after dinner and when the ladies have left the dining room," and one is never to smoke into another's face. A cigarette or cigar may never be left at the edge of a table or any other piece of furniture, as damage to the furniture may result, rather a smoker is to ask for an ashtray. If the hosts are reluctant to supply one, the smoker is to get rid of the cigarette, as well as any offensive odour if possible, outside. A smoker is never to strike a match directly at someone, as their clothing may be flammable. One is to never put out a cigarette on any surface which was not intended for such a purpose, nor is one to throw a lit cigarette into a fireplace, lest an unwanted fire be ignited in the middle of summer, or out the window when a flammable object, such as an awning or a convertible, is outside. One is never to spill ashes onto the floor.

Places in which smoking, or holding a lit cigarette, should be avoided include houses in which no cigarettes, lighters or ashtrays are set out, churches or places of other religious services, a sickroom or a room in which an individual is recovering, unless they themselves are smoking, a dance floor and businesses, institutions or communities in consideration of their regulations, customs and prejudices.
