= I promessi sposi (disambiguation) =

I promessi sposi is the original title of The Betrothed, an 1827–1842 Italian historical novel by Alessandro Manzoni.

I promessi sposi may also refer to:

- The Betrothed (1923 film), an Italian silent historical drama film
- The Betrothed (1941 film), an Italian historical drama film
- The Betrothed (1964 film), an Italian-Spanish historical drama film
- The Betrothed (miniseries), a 1989 Italian television miniseries
- I promessi sposi (miniseries), a 1967 Italian television miniseries
- I promessi sposi (Petrella opera), an 1869 opera by Errico Petrella
- I promessi sposi (Ponchielli opera), an 1856 opera by Amilcare Ponchielli

== See also ==
- The Betrothed (disambiguation)
