= Ash =

Waste product of fires

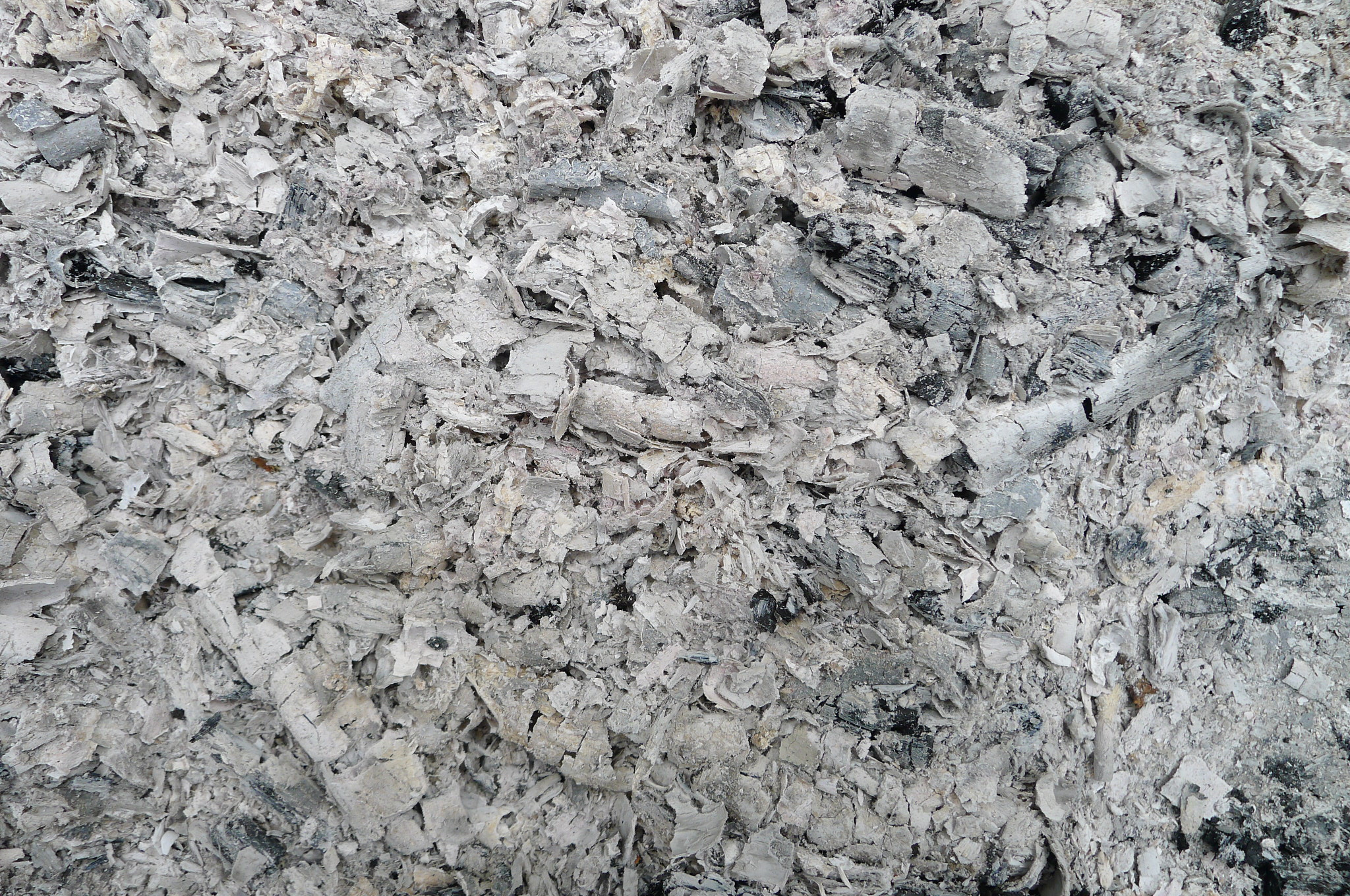
Wood ash

Ash is the solid remnants of fires. Specifically, ash refers to all non-aqueous, non-gaseous residues that remain after something burns. In analytical chemistry, to analyse the mineral and metal content of chemical samples, ash is the non-gaseous, non-liquid residue after complete combustion.

Ashes as the end product of incomplete combustion are mostly mineral, but usually still contain an amount of combustible organic or other oxidizable residues. The best-known type of ash is wood ash, as a product of wood combustion in campfires, fireplaces, etc. The darker the wood ashes, the higher the content of remaining charcoal from incomplete combustion. The ashes are of different types. Some ashes contain natural compounds that make soil fertile. Others have chemical compounds that can be toxic but may break down in soil from chemical changes and microorganism activity.

Like soap, ash is also a disinfecting agent (alkaline). The World Health Organization recommends ash or sand as alternative for handwashing when soap is not available. Before industrialization, ash soaked in water was the primary means of obtaining potash.

== Natural occurrence ==
Ash occurs naturally from any fire that burns vegetation, and may disperse in the soil to fertilise it, or clump under it for long enough to carbonise into coal.

== Composition ==
The composition of the ash varies depending on the product burned and its origin. The "ash content" or "mineral content" of a product is derived its incineration under temperatures ranging from 150 °C (302 °F) to 900 °C (1,650 °F).

=== Wood and plant matter ===
The composition of ash derived from wood and other plant matter varies based on plant species, parts of the plants (such as bark, trunk, or young branches with foliage), the type of soil, and the time of year. The composition of these ashes also differs greatly depending on the mode of combustion.

Wood ashes, in addition to residual carbonaceous materials (unconsumed embers, activated carbons impregnated with carbonaceous particles, tars, various gases, etc.), contain between 20% and 50% calcium in the form of calcium oxide and are generally rich in potassium carbonate. Ashes derived from grasses, and the Gramineae family in particular, are rich in silica. The color of the ash comes from small proportions of inorganic minerals such as iron oxides and manganese. The oxidized metal elements that constitute wood ash are mostly considered alkaline.

For example, ash collected from wood boilers is composed of

- 17–33% calcium in the form of calcium oxide (CaO)
- 2–6% potassium in the form of potassium oxide (K_{2}O)
- 2.5–4.6% magnesium in the form of magnesium oxide (MgO)
- 1–6% phosphorus in the form of phosphorus pentoxide (P_{2}O_{5})
- 3% in total of oxides such as iron oxide, manganese oxide, and sodium oxide

The pH of the ash is between 10 and 13, mostly due to the fact that the oxides of calcium, potassium, and sodium are strong bases. Acidic components such as carbon dioxide, phosphoric acid, silicic acid, and sulfuric acid are rarely present and, in the presence of the previously mentioned bases, are generally found in the form of salts, respectively carbonates, phosphates, silicates and sulphates.

Strictly speaking, calcium and potassium salts produce the aforementioned calcium oxide (also known as quicklime) and potassium during the combustion of organic matter. But, in practice, quicklime is only obtained via lime-kiln, and potash (from potassium carbonate) or baking soda (from sodium carbonate) is extracted from the ashes.

Other substances such as sulfur, chlorine, iron or sodium only appear in small quantities. Still others are rarely found in wood, such as aluminum, zinc, and boron. (depending on the trace elements drawn from the soil by the incinerated plants).

Mineral content in ash depends on the species of tree burned, even in the same soil conditions. More chloride is found in conifer trees than broadleaf trees, with seven times as much found in spruces than in oak trees. There is twice as much phosphoric acid in the European aspen than in oaks and twice as much magnesium in elm trees than in the Scotch pine.

Ash composition also varies by which part of the tree was burnt. Silicon and calcium salts are more abundant in bark than in wood, while potassium salts are primarily found in wood. Compositional variation also occurred based on the season in which the tree died.

== Specific types ==
=== Cremation ashes ===
Cremation ashes, also called cremated remains or "cremains," are the bodily remains left from cremation. They often take the form of a grey powder resembling coarse sand. While often referred to as ashes, the remains primarily consist of powdered bone fragments due to the cremation process, which eliminates the body's organic materials. People often store these ashes in containers like urns, although they are also sometimes buried or scattered in specific locations.

=== Food ashes ===
In food processing, mineral and ash content is used to characterize the presence of organic and inorganic components in food for monitoring quality, nutritional quantification and labeling, analyzing microbiological stability, and more. This process can be used to measure minerals like calcium, sodium, potassium, and phosphorus as well as metal content such as lead, mercury, cadmium, and aluminum.

=== Joss paper ash ===
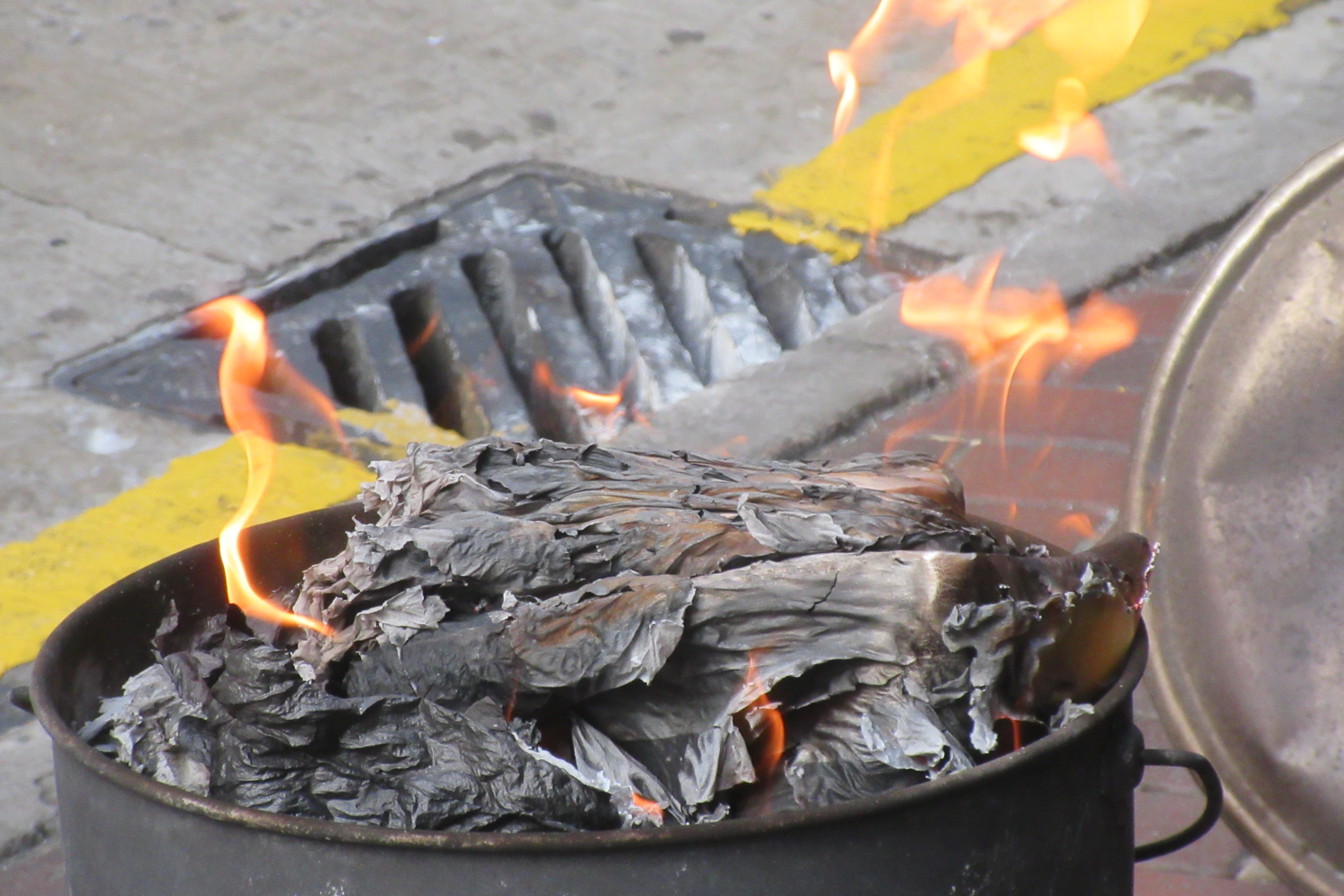
Joss paper ash. With wind and dispersion, the size of particulates decreases, while the number of particles increases.

Analysis of the contents of ash samples from Vietnam and Singapore shows that joss paper burning can emit many pollutants detrimental to air quality. There is a significant amount of heavy metals in the dust fume and bottom ash, e.g., aluminium, iron, manganese, copper, lead, zinc and cadmium.

"Burning of joss paper accounted for up to 42% of the atmospheric rBC [refractory black carbon] mass, higher than traffic (14-17%), crop residue (10-17%), coal (18-20%) during the Hanyi festival in northwest China", according to a 2022 study, "the overall air quality can be worsened due to the practice of uncontrolled burning of joss paper during the festival, which is not just confined to the people who do the burning," and "burning joss paper during worship activities is common in China and most Asian countries with similar traditions."

The composition of joss paper ash largely depends on the types / composition of the joss paper goods being burnt, and there are many of them.

=== Slash-and-burn ash ===
In slash-and-burn agriculture, forests are typically cut months before a dry season. The "slash" is permitted to dry and then burned in the following dry season. The resulting ash fertilizes the soil and the burned field is then planted at the beginning of the next rainy season with crops such as rice, maize, cassava, or other staples. This work was once done using simple tools such as machetes, axes, hoes and shovels.

=== Wildfire ash ===
High levels of heavy metals, including lead, arsenic, cadmium, and copper were found in the ash debris following the 2007 Californian wildfires. Following the fires, a joint state, county, and city cleanup project was organized to manage the removal of contaminated ash and structural debris from affected residential properties. In the devastating California Camp Fire (2018) that killed 85 people, lead levels increased by around 50 times in the hours following the fire at a site nearby (Chico). Zinc concentration also increased significantly in Modesto, 150 miles away. Heavy metals such as manganese and calcium were found in numerous California fires as well.

=== Others ===
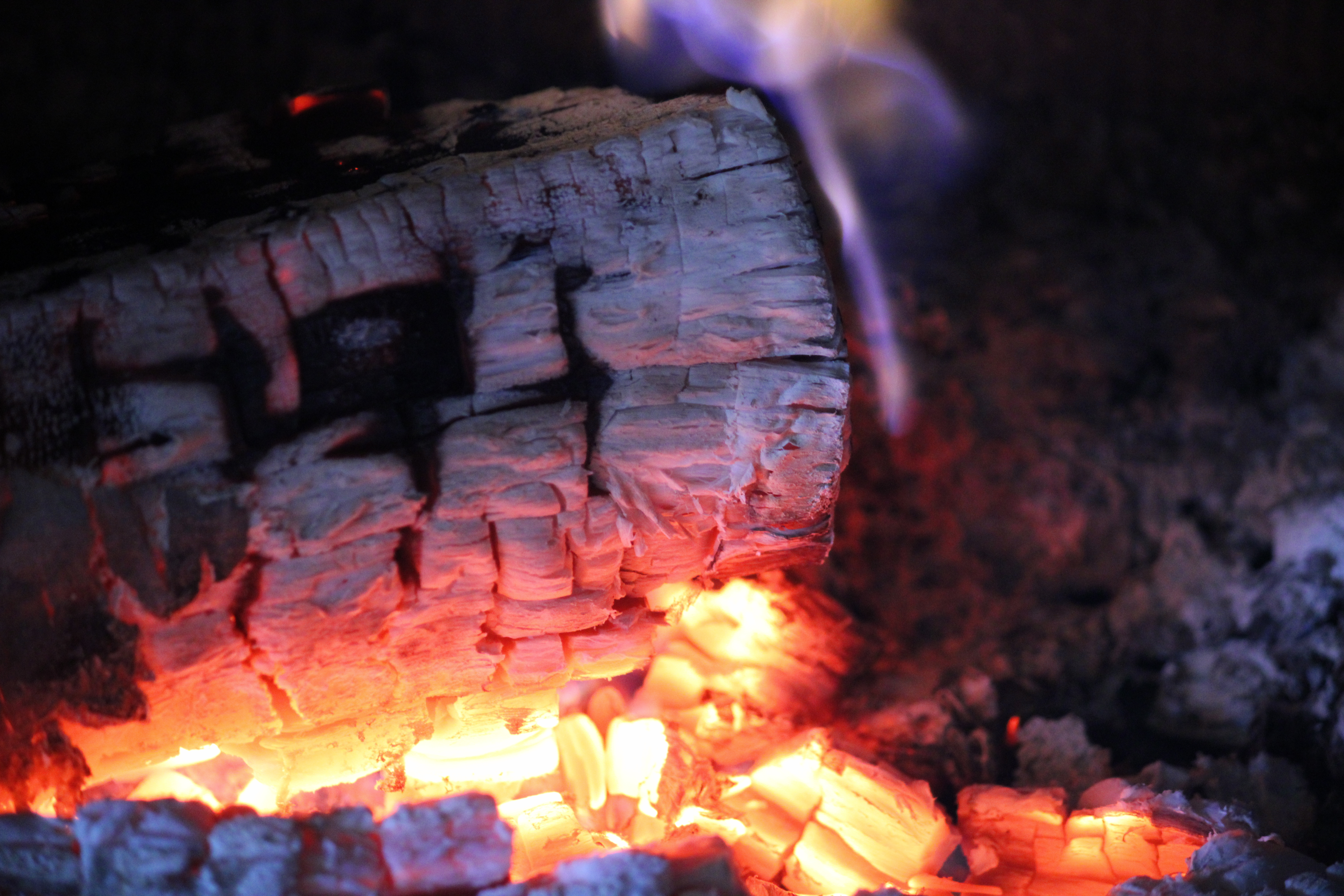
Firewood combusting into ash and coal in a wood-burning stove, 2025

- Ashes from
  - Stubble burning
  - Open burning of waste
- Cigarette or cigar ash
- Incinerator bottom ash, a form of ash produced in incinerators
- Products of coal combustion
  - Bottom ash
  - Fly ash
- Volcanic ash, ash that consists of fragmented glass, rock, and minerals that appears during an eruption.
- Wood ash

== Uses ==
=== Fertilizer ===
Ashes have been used since the Neolithic period as fertilizer because they are rich in minerals, especially potash and essential nutrients. They are the main fertilizer in slash-and-burn agriculture, which eventually evolved into controlled burn and forest clearing practices. People in ancient history already possessed extensive knowledge of the nutrients produced by different ashes. For clay soil in particular, using ash without modification or using charrée, ash whose minerals have been washed with water, was necessary.

=== Laundry ===
Because ashes contain potash, they can be used to make biodegradable laundry detergent. The demand for organic products has led to renewed interest for laundry using ash derived from wood. The French word for laundry lessive is from the Latin word lixivia, which means a substance made from ash and used to wash laundry. This usage also developed into a small, traditional architectural structure to the west of Rhône mainstem: the bugadière, a masonry structure built with stone or cob, that looks like a cabinet and that carries dirty laundry and fireplace ash; when the bugadière is full, the laundry and ash are moved to a laundry container and boiled in water.

Laundry using ash derived from wood has the benefit of being free, easy to produce, sustainable, and as efficient as standard laundry washing methods.

== Health effects ==
Direct health risks of exposure to ash include irritation to the skin, nose and throat if contacted by fire ash. This could also cause coughing and nose bleeds. Fine ash particles can be breathed in and cause further issues for those with asthma. As ash can contain high levels of heavy metals, such as lead, cadmium and arsenic, along with asbestos (from old buildings) and flame retardants. The health risks associated with exposure to ash from burnt buildings are increased compared to ash from wild fires. Those with existing lung or heart conditions, pregnant women, the elderly and young children are seen as the most at risk.

== Effect on precipitation ==
"Particles of dust or smoke in the atmosphere are essential for precipitation. These particles, called 'condensation nuclei,' provide a surface for water vapor to condense upon. This helps water droplets gather together and become large enough to fall to the earth which might affect the quality of our water if not for filters."

== Effect on climate change ==
Wildfires produce carbon dioxide and other greenhouse gasses contributing to a warming climate. Scientists have calculated that wildfires released around 8 Billion tonnes of carbon dioxide into the atmosphere each year over 2 decades up until 2018. This is equal to around 5-10% of total global CO₂ emissions every year however the fires are partially offset by regrowth of plants within the burnt area. This produces a feedback loop whereby increased temperatures cause longer periods of fires and more intense fires causing increased emissions and therefore warming. Wildfires also release aerosols such as Black Carbon which can absorb heat. Black carbon along with other particles released during wildfires fall onto Snow and Ice in the Arctic darkening the surface causing less reflection and faster melting.

== See also ==
- Aerosol
- Ash (chemistry)
- Black carbon
- Carbon, basic component of ashes
- Carbon black
- Charcoal, carbon residue after heating wood mainly used as traditional fuel
- Cinereous, consisting of ashes, ash-colored or ash-like
- Coal, consisting of carbon as ash, and ash can be converted into coal
- Construction waste
- Dust | Fugitive dust
- Potash, a term for many useful potassium salts that traditionally derived from plant ashes, but today are typically mined from underground deposits
