= The Betrothed (poem) =

Poem written by Rudyard Kipling

"The Betrothed" is a poem by Rudyard Kipling, first published in book form in Departmental Ditties (1886).

It is a tongue-in-cheek work by the young bachelor Kipling, who affected a very worldly-wise stance. In it, he takes as his epigraph the report of evidence in a breach of promise case, "You must choose between me and your cigar". The poem simply has a narrator musing on the difference between his fiancée Maggie and his habit of smoking cigars:

For Maggie has written a letter to give me my choice between
The wee little whimpering Love and the great god Nick o' Teen.

— lines 37-38

He weighs up Maggie's looks, and what she will be at fifty; the limitations of monogamy against "a harem of dusky beauties"; and the relatively unknown woman against the tried and tested "Counsellors" and "comforters". His conclusion is:

And a woman is only a woman, but a good Cigar is a Smoke.

Light me another Cuba—I hold to my first-sworn vows.
If Maggie will have no rival, I'll have no Maggie for Spouse!

— lines 50-52
