= Cigar ash =

Burnt residue left by a tobacco product

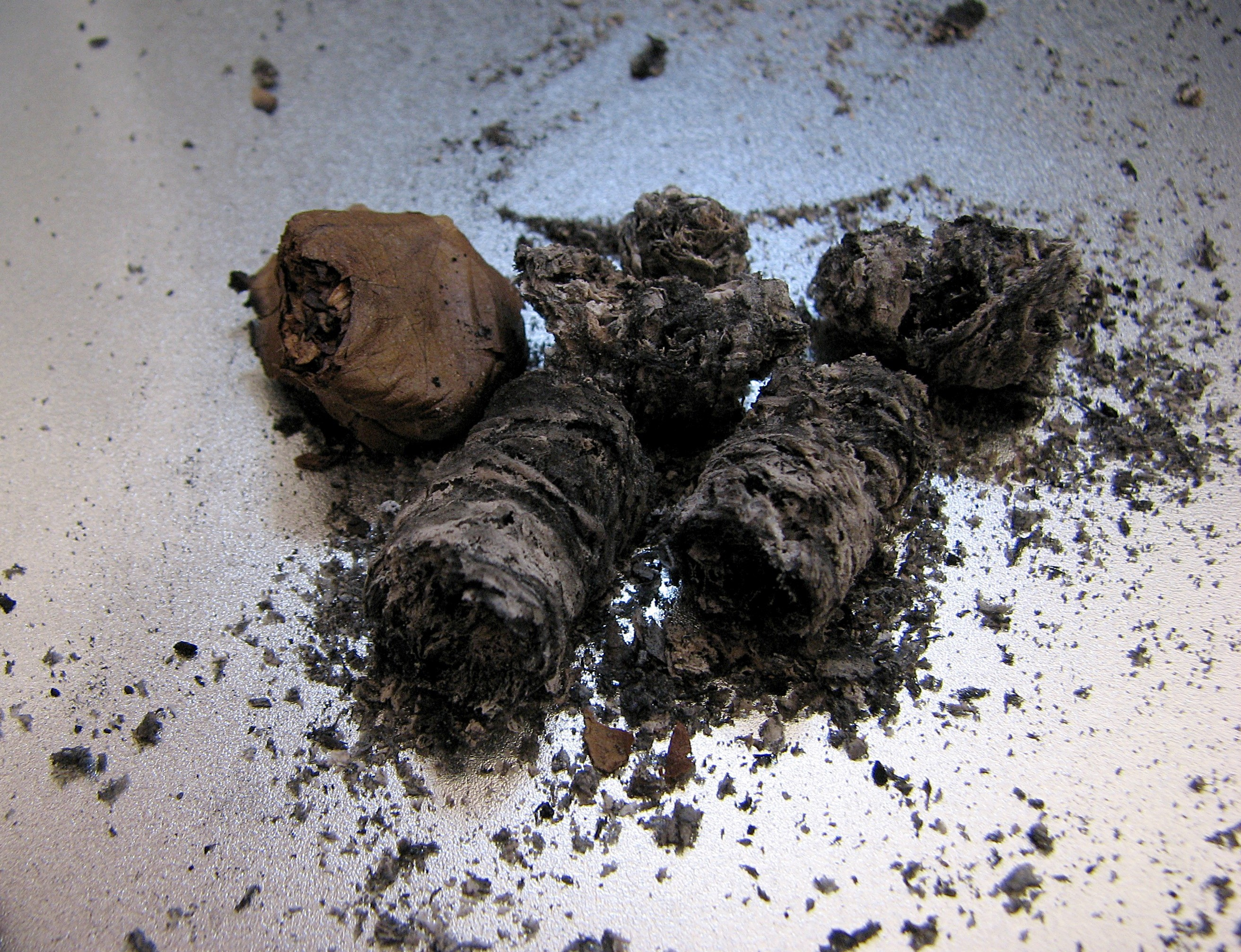
Cigar and ashes

Cigar ash, also known as cigarette ash, is the ash produced by tobacco products as it is smoked.

== Smoking ==
Connoisseurs of cigars disagree as to whether the quality of a cigar may be determined from the appearance of its ash.

== Uses ==
Cigar ash may be mixed with chalk to make a dentifrice or tooth powder. It may also be mixed with poppyseed oil to make paint in shades of grey.

== Disposal ==
Usually, during smoking, the ash is an unwanted product that is to be disposed of. An ashtray is used to dispose of ashes and butts without creating a fire hazard. Once it is certain that any burning has been extinguished, the ashtray contents are disposed of.

== Sherlock Holmes ==
The fictional detective Sherlock Holmes was an expert in the study of cigar ash and wrote a monograph, Upon the Distinction Between the Ashes of the Various Tobaccos, about it. This expertise was used in his cases such as A Study in Scarlet, The Boscombe Valley Mystery and The Hound of the Baskervilles. This is often used as an example of deduction or the Baconian method in philosophical accounts of science and reasoning.

== See also ==
- List of cigar brands
