= Green Citadel of Magdeburg =

2005 German building by Friedensreich Hundertwasser

Coordinates: 52.1270°N 11.6343°E

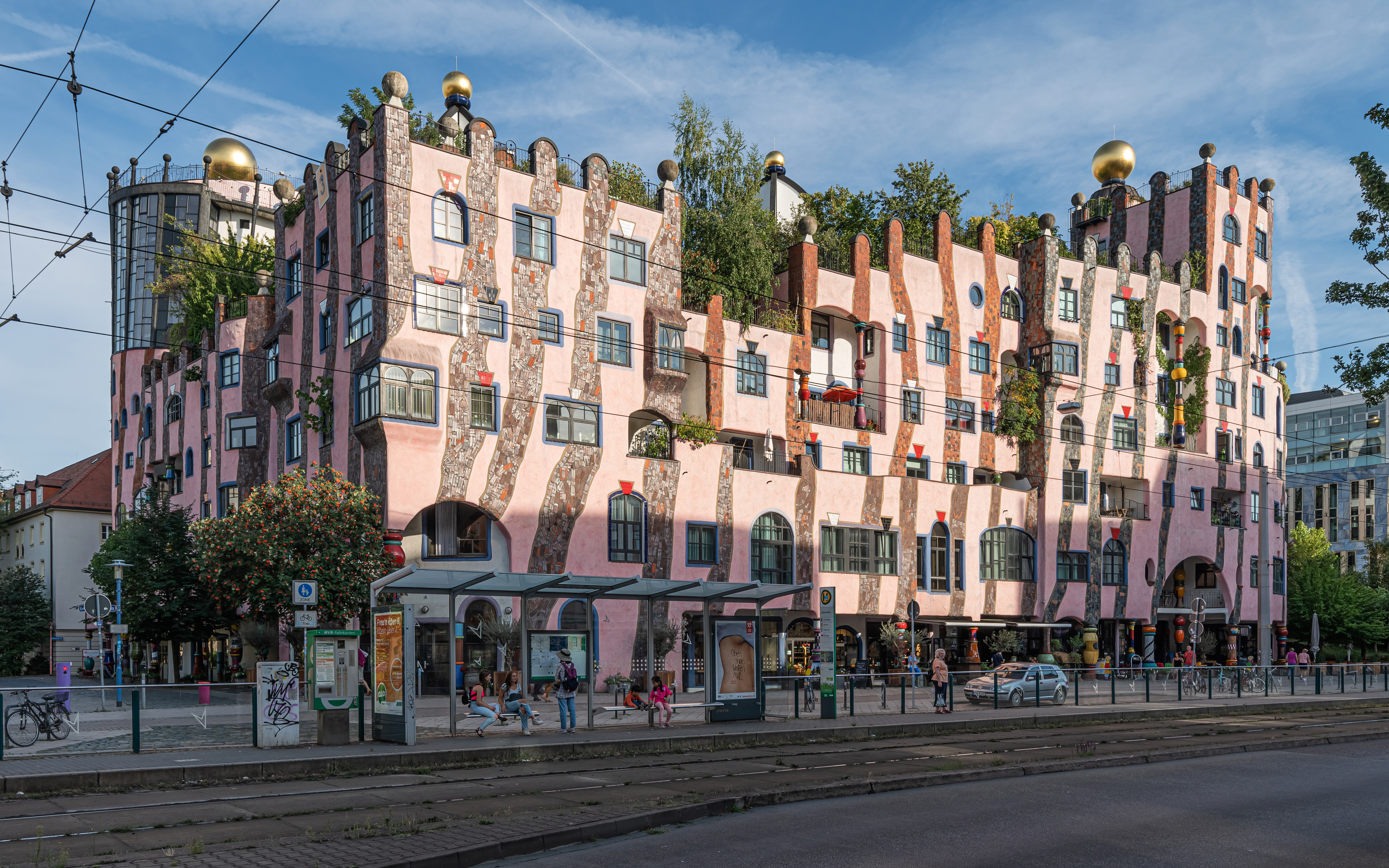
Green Citadel from street

The Grüne Zitadelle ("Green Citadel") is a mixed use building in Magdeburg designed by Austrian architect Friedensreich Hundertwasser. Completed in 2005, the structure was one of Hundertwasser's final projects before his death in 2000.

== History ==
The Green Citadel is located in the city center on Magdeburg's main shopping street, Breiter Weg, near Cathedral Square and State Parliament building. Construction was overseen by developer Gero AG and the contractor Montage-Bau GmbH. Artistic oversight was provided by Guener Janura AG, a company founded by Hundertwasser. The total cost to construct the Green Citadel was approximately 27 million euros.

The site of the Green Citadel was first occupied by St. Nicholas's Church (demolished 1959), and several surrounding buildings which had been destroyed by bombing in World War II. In the 1970s, a Plattenbau was constructed on the site. In 1995, Rolf Opitz then chairman of "Stadt Magdeburg von 1954" proposed approaching Hundertwasser to redesign the existing apartment structure. Hundertwasser initially agreed, but later decided to construct a new building so as to allow for greater creative freedom. This was done with the hopes that Magdeburg could attract greater tourism in the post-war era.

== Features ==
The Green Citadel is roughly 121,632 square feet. The mixed-use structure contains retail space, cafe, restaurant, theater, art space, daycare center, information center, office space, medical center, and 55 apartments. The Green Citadel also has two courtyards and a large fountain.

Each of the windows is different, combining a mix of window panes, window shapes, and window ornamentation. Tenants also have the right to decorate the facade around their windows ("Fensterrecht").

The building's name comes from its grass covered roof and large number of trees on, around, and within the building. Some trees were planted on the roof while others took root along exterior walls of the apartments. These trees are subsequently cared for by the respective residents of the apartments. The building's exterior is intended to change with minimal upkeep as the trees grow and paint fades, emphasizing the aging of the structure.

== Pictures ==
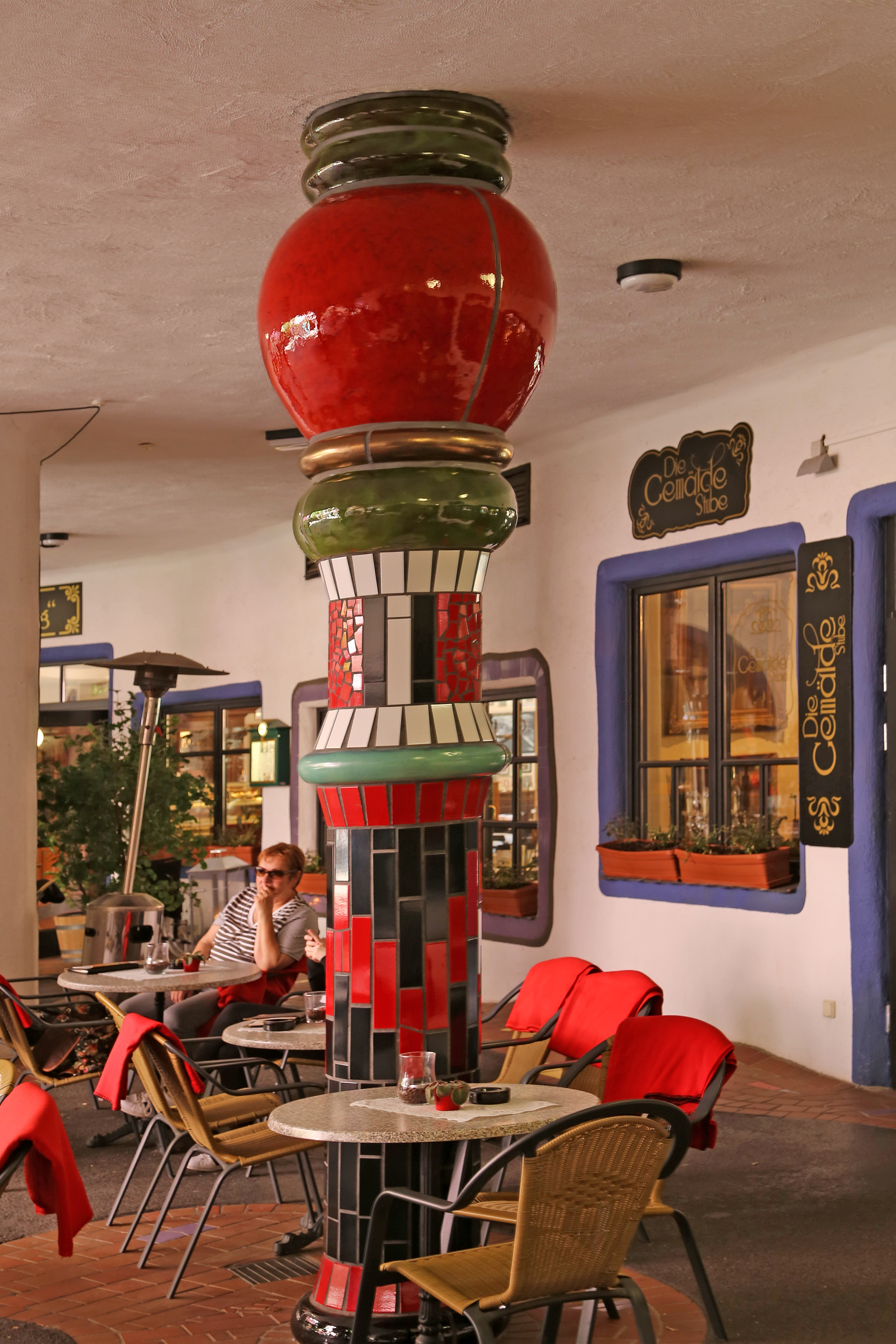

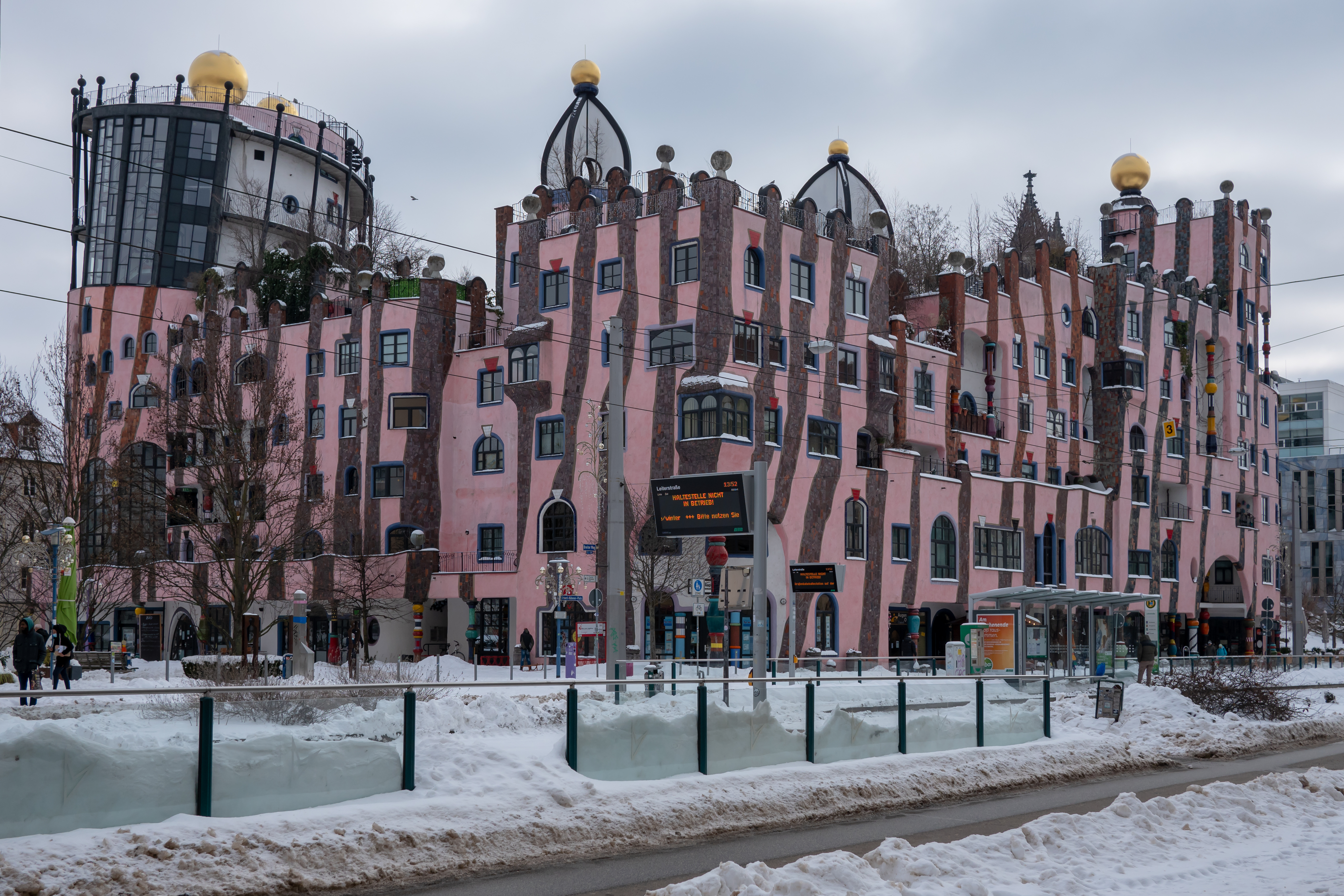

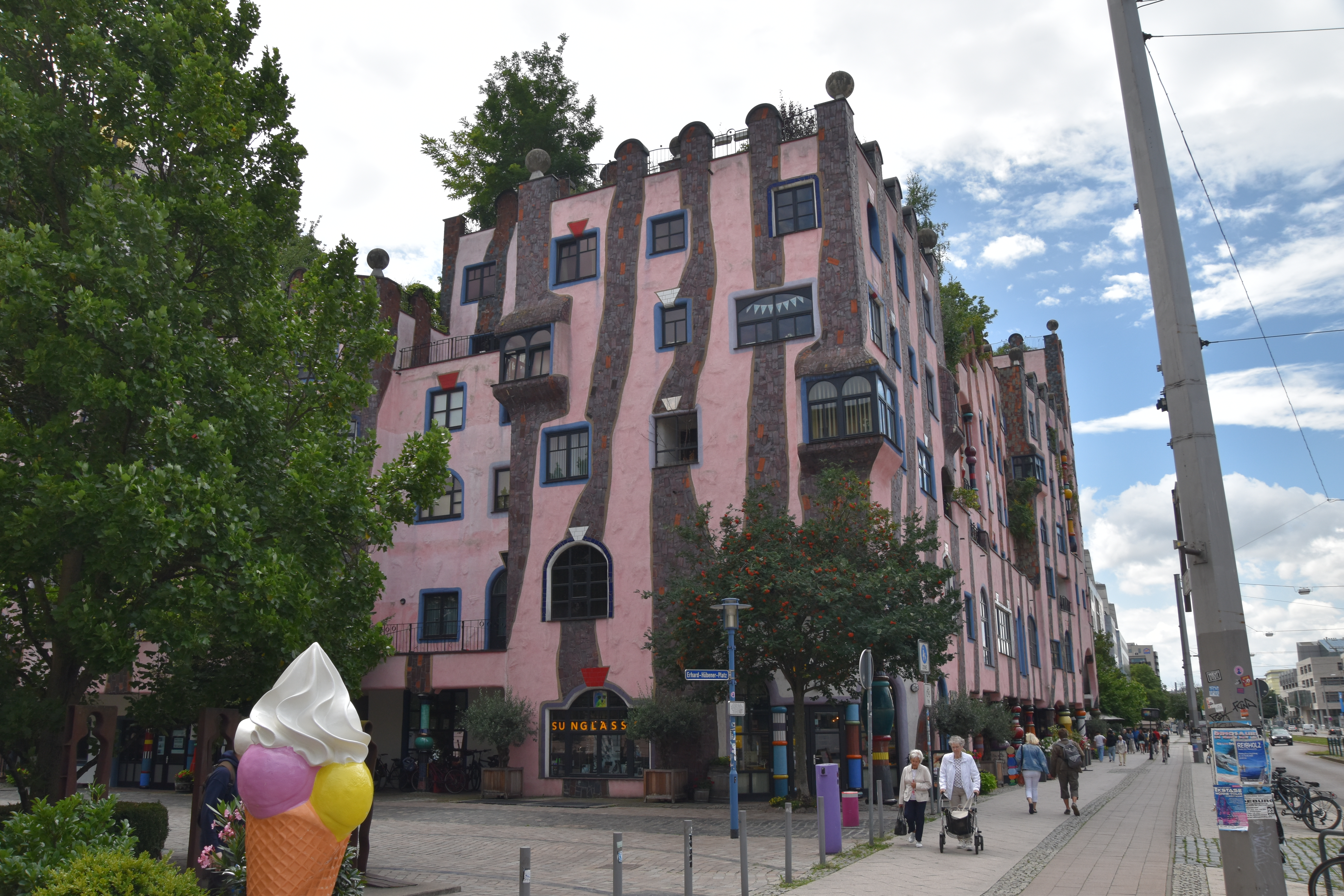

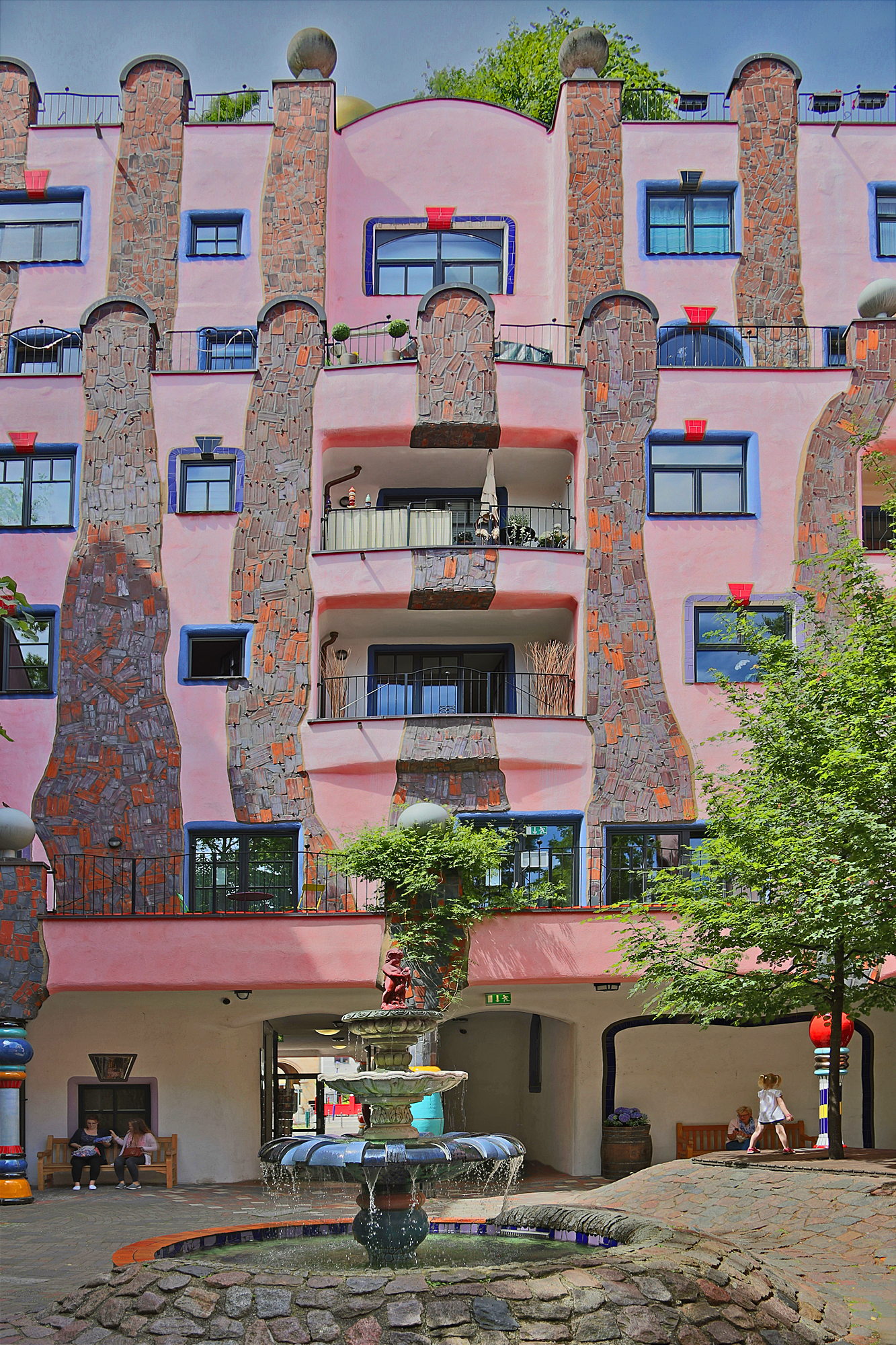

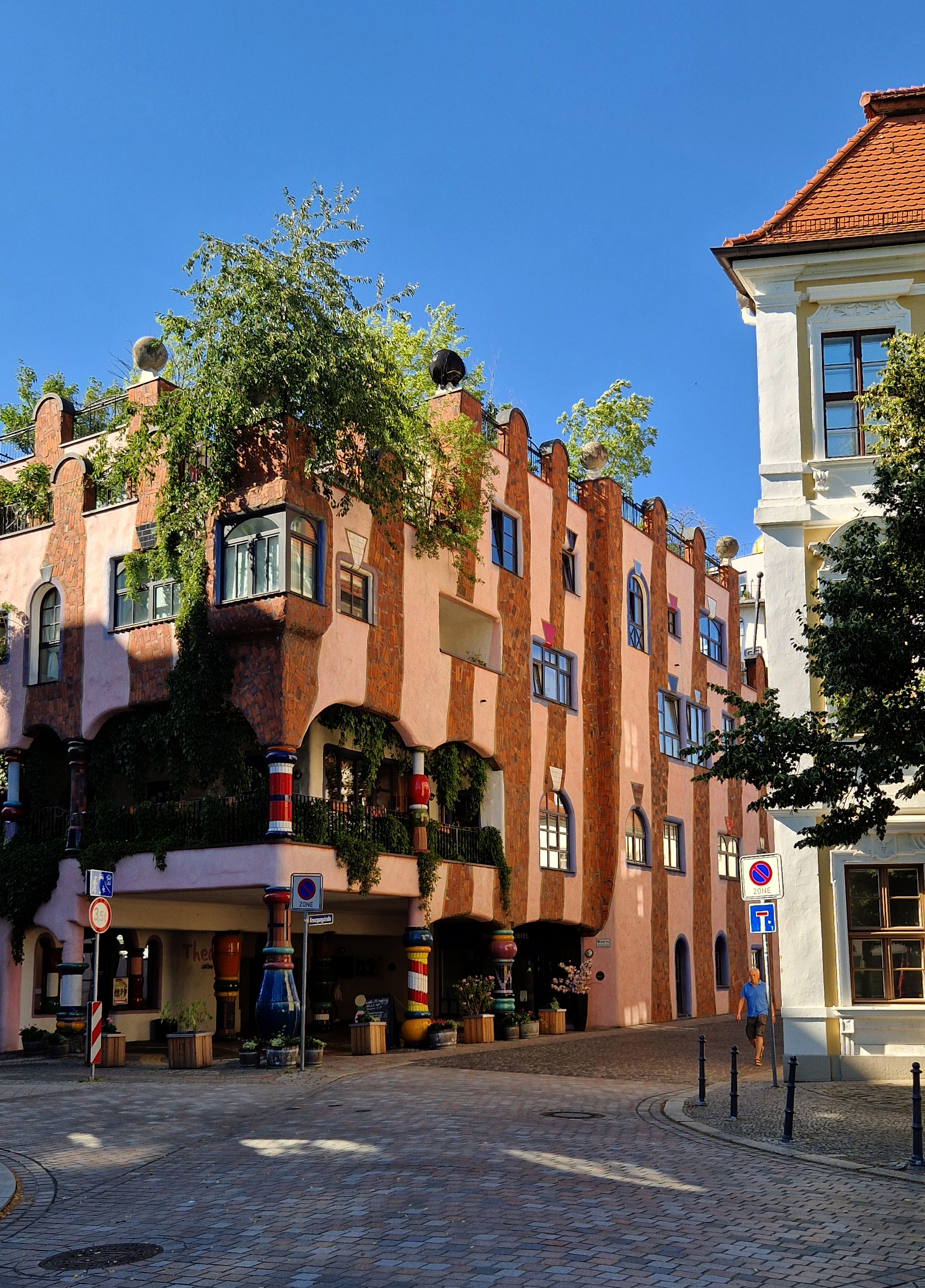

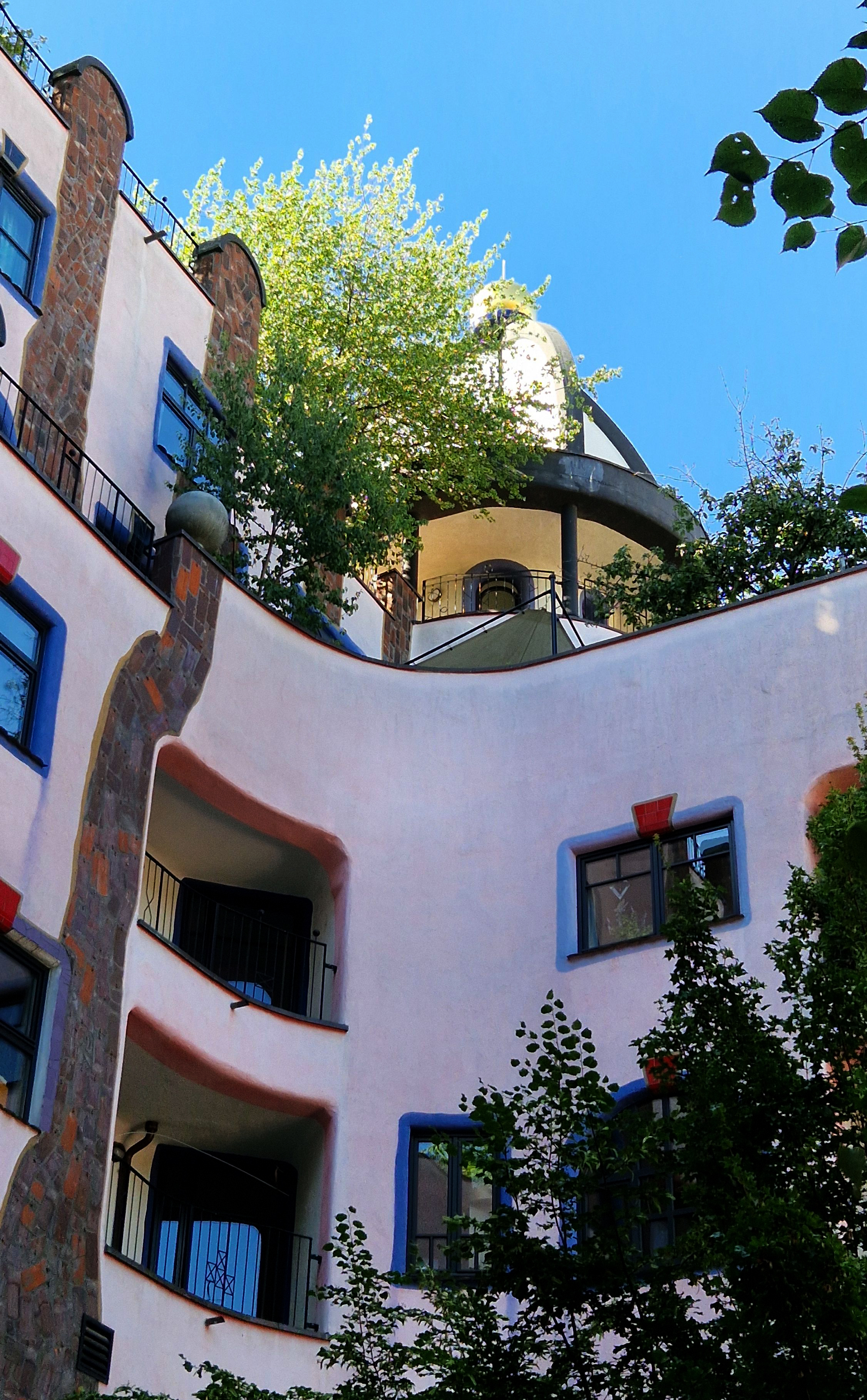

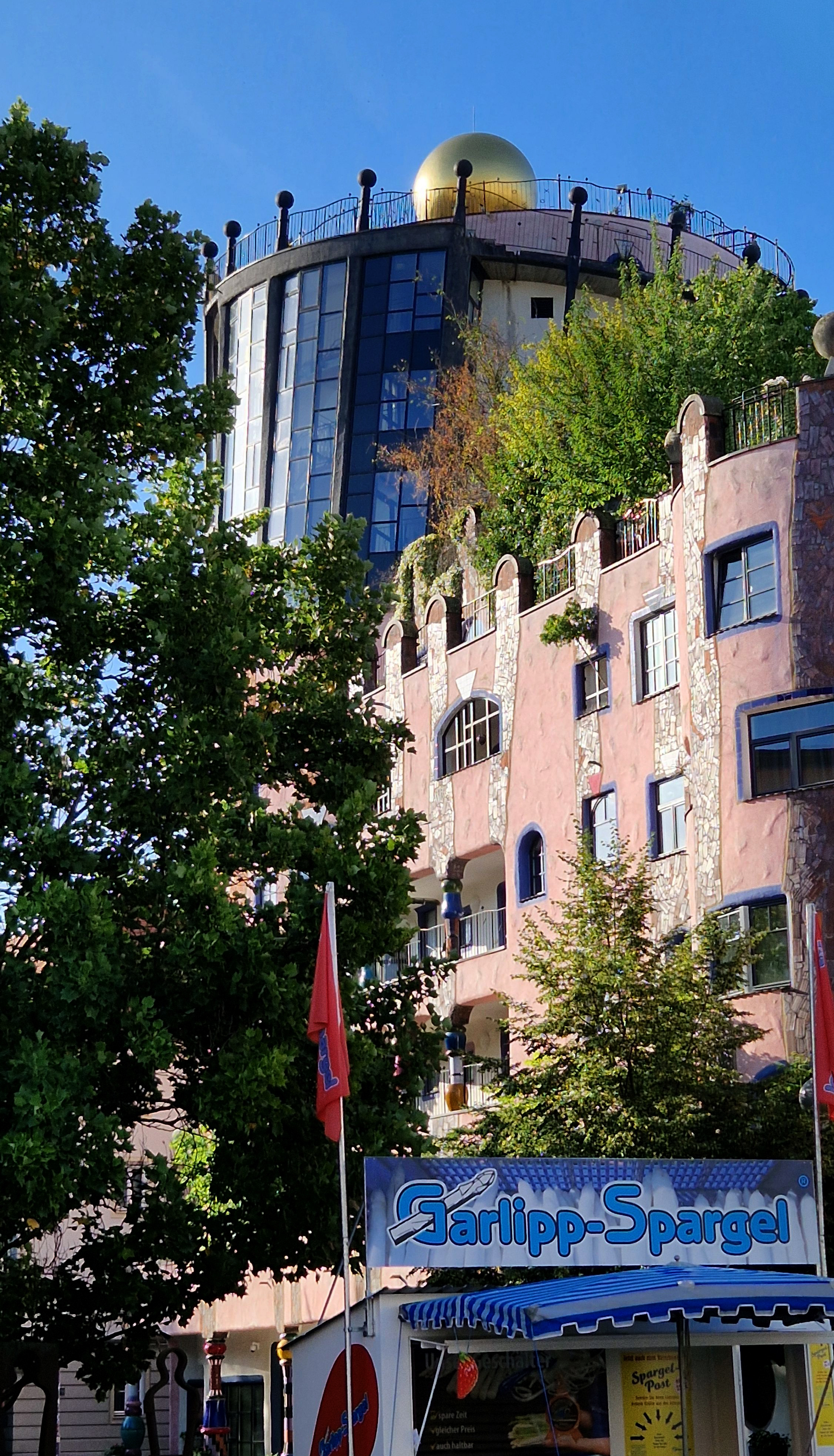

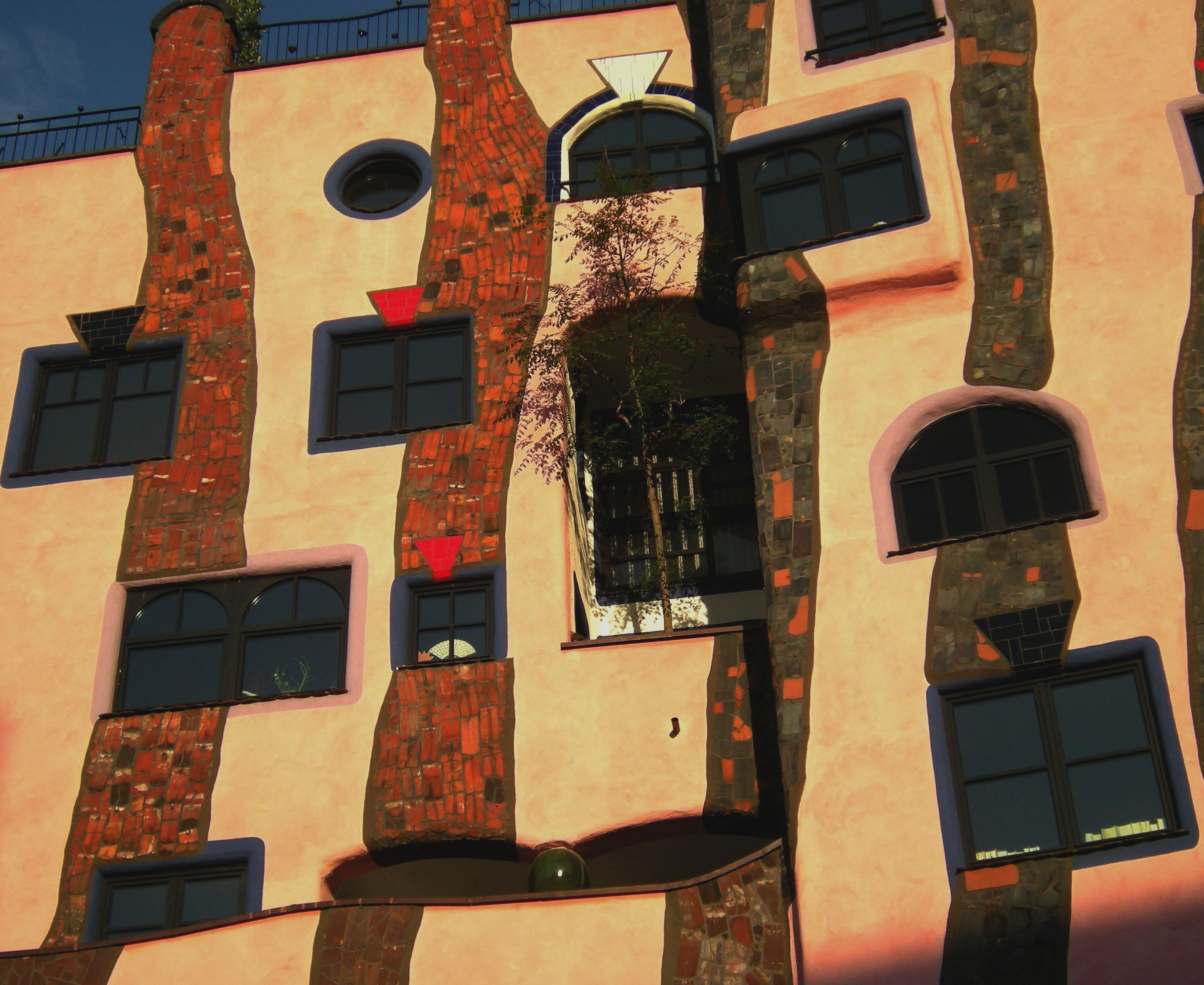
Tree growing from window

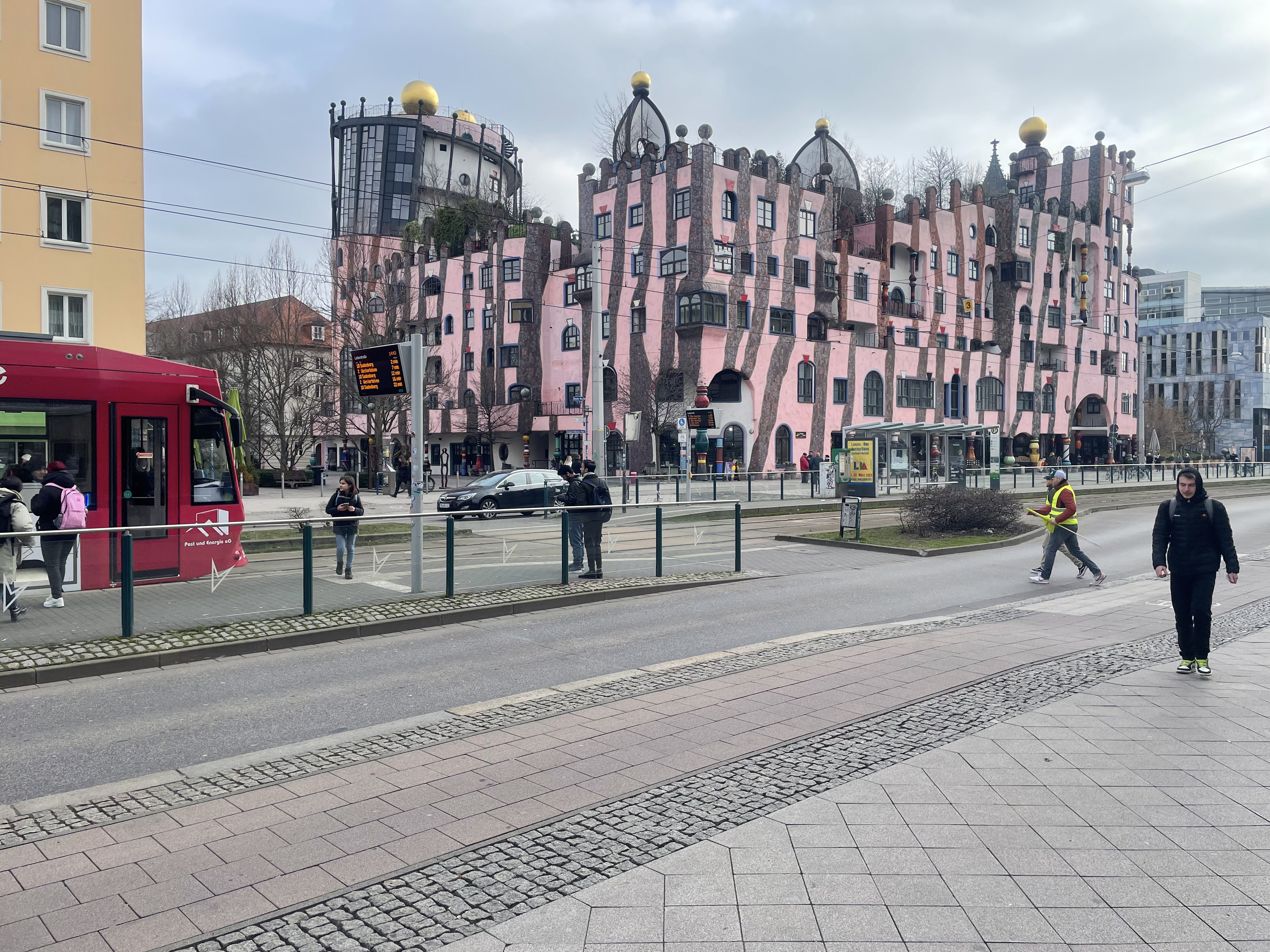

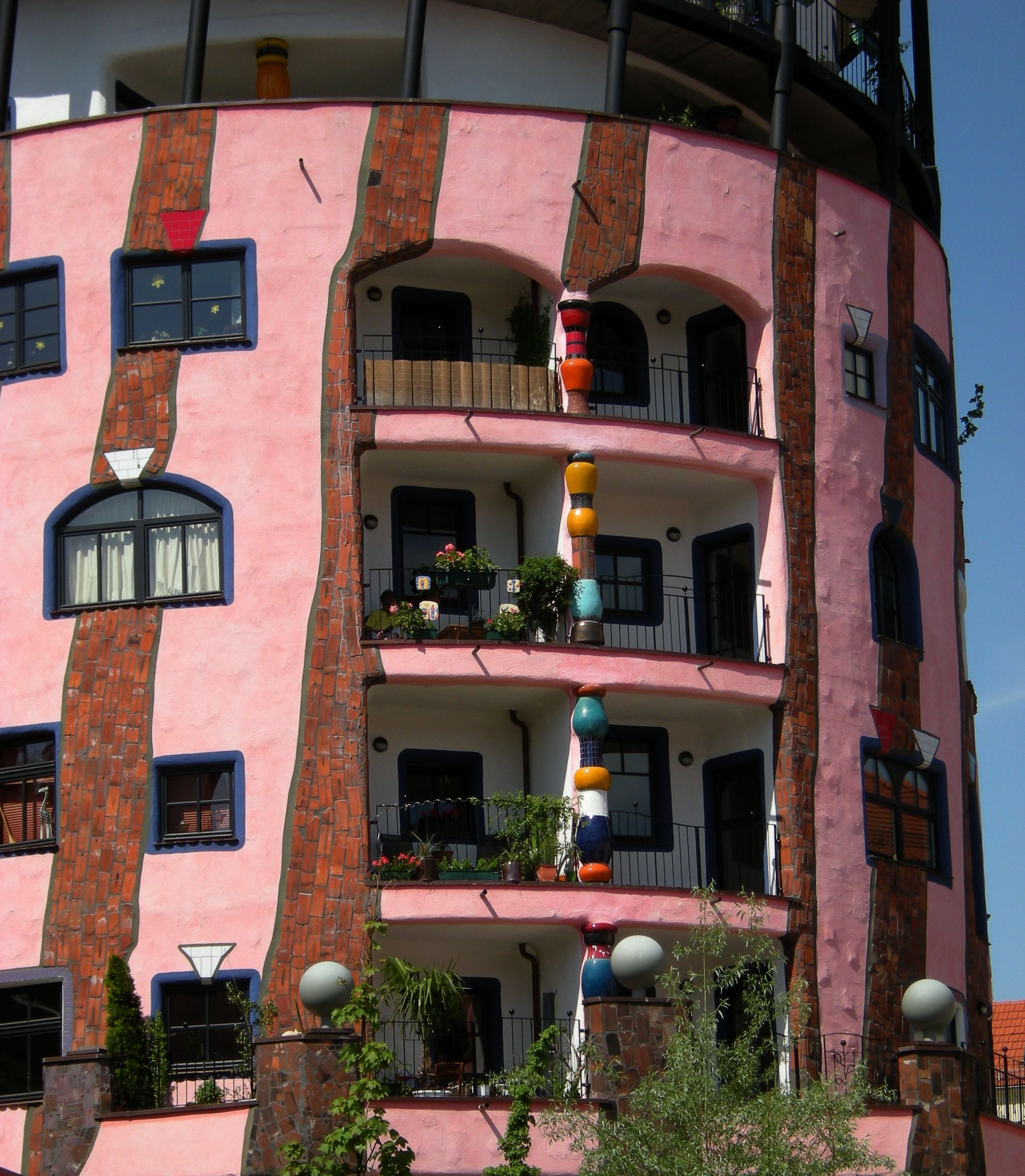

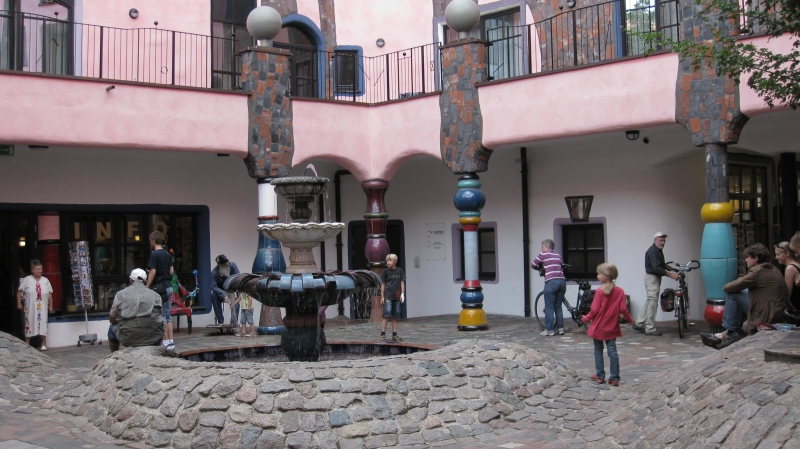

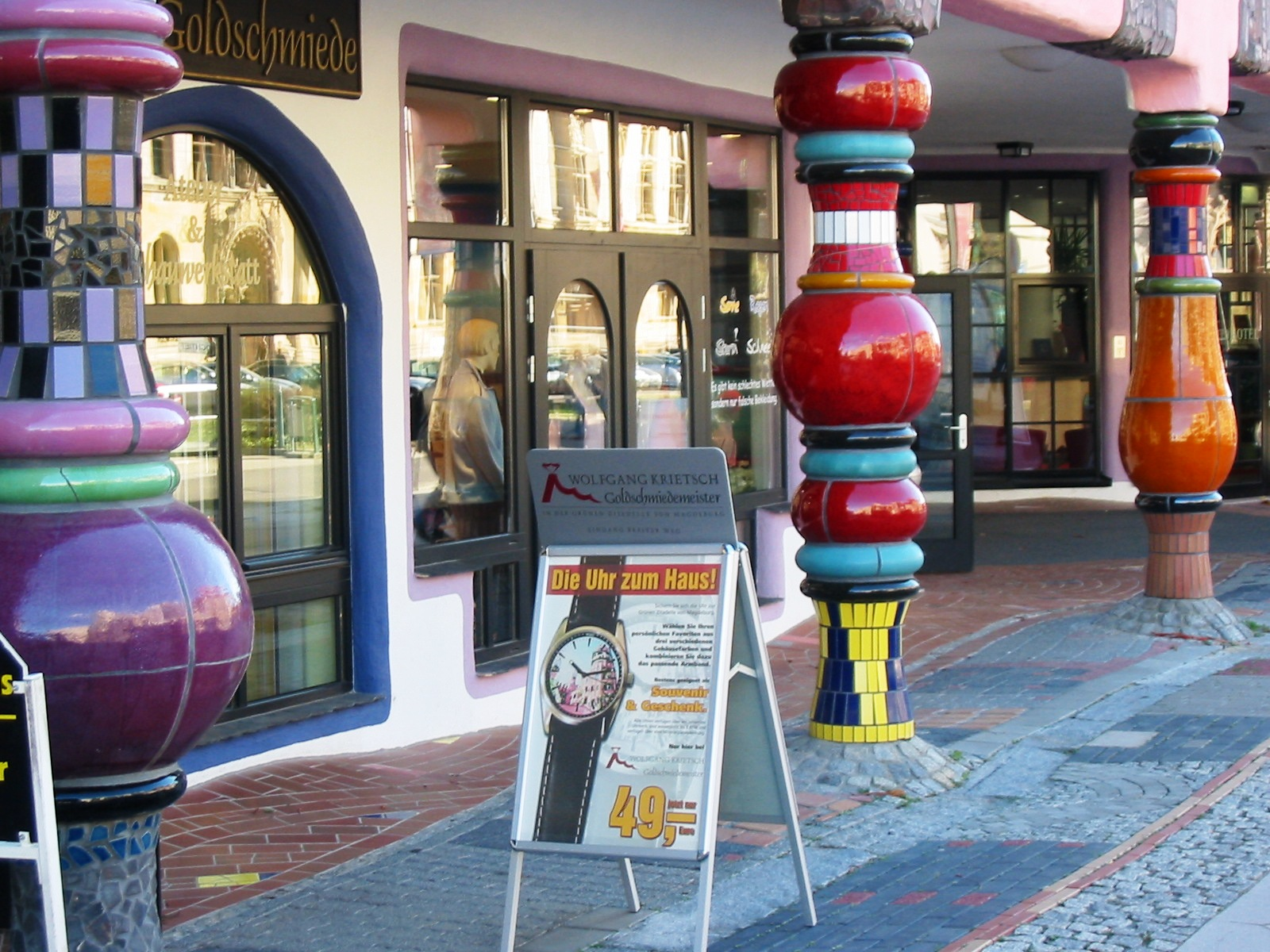

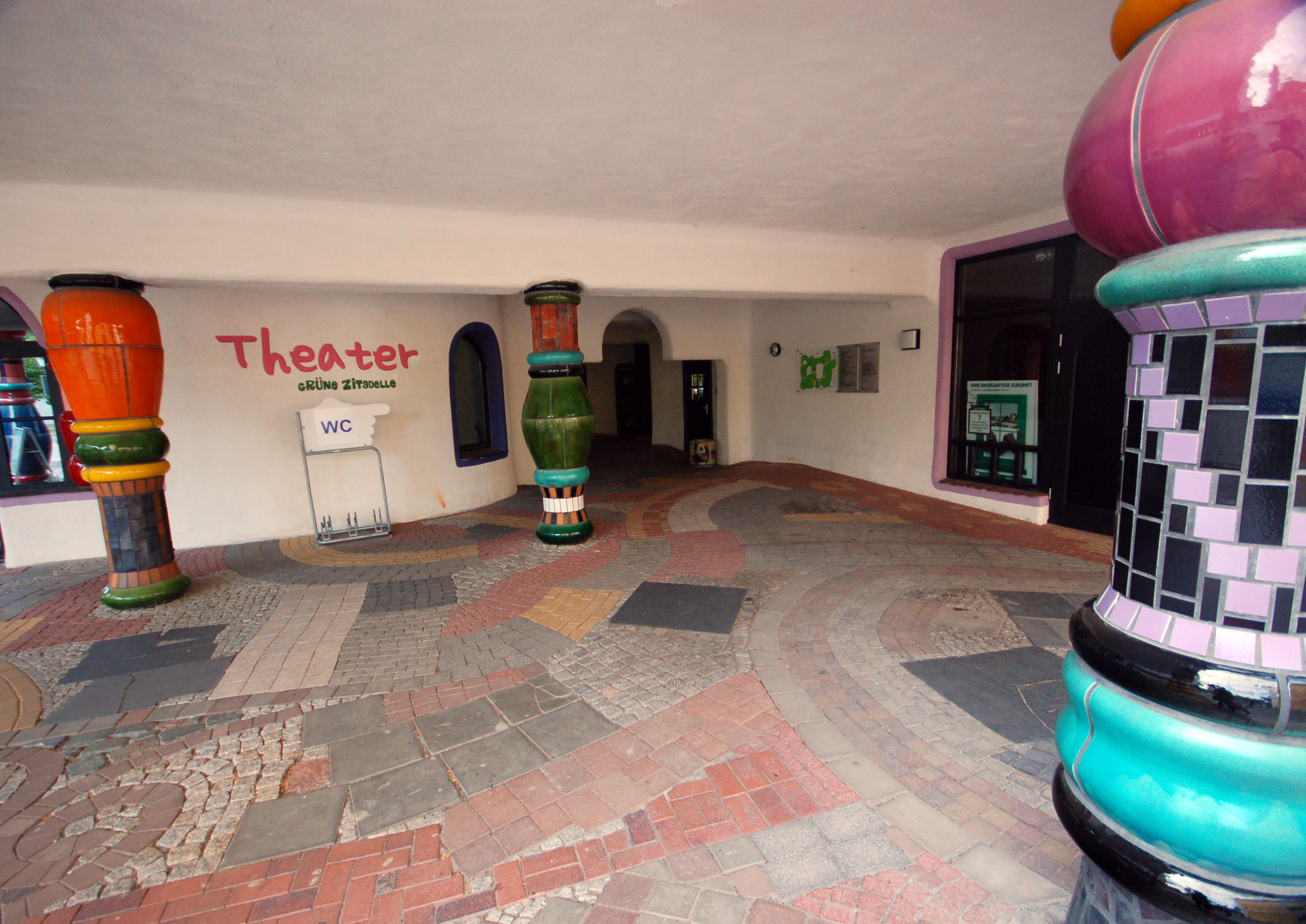
Exterior view of the theater

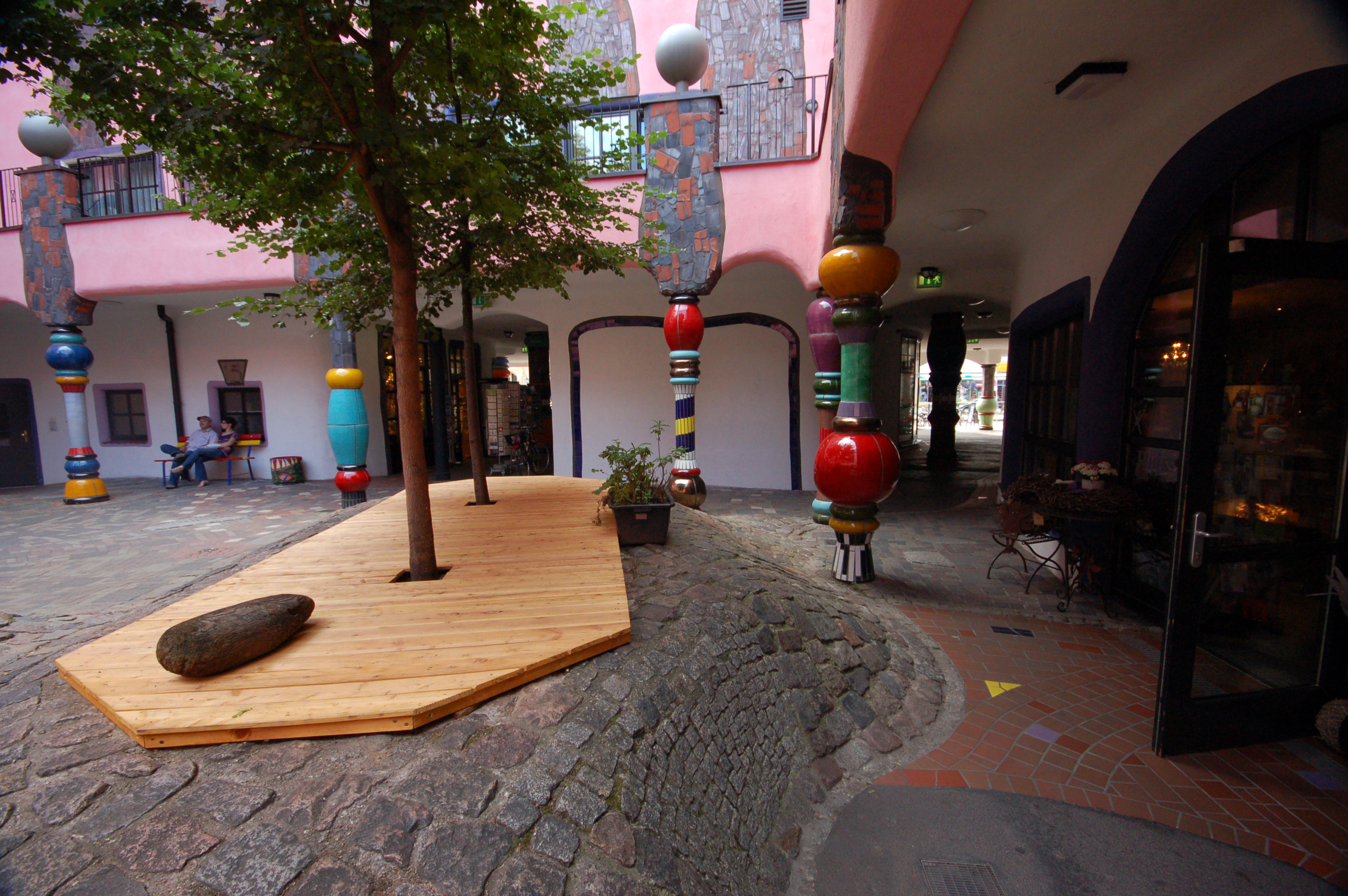

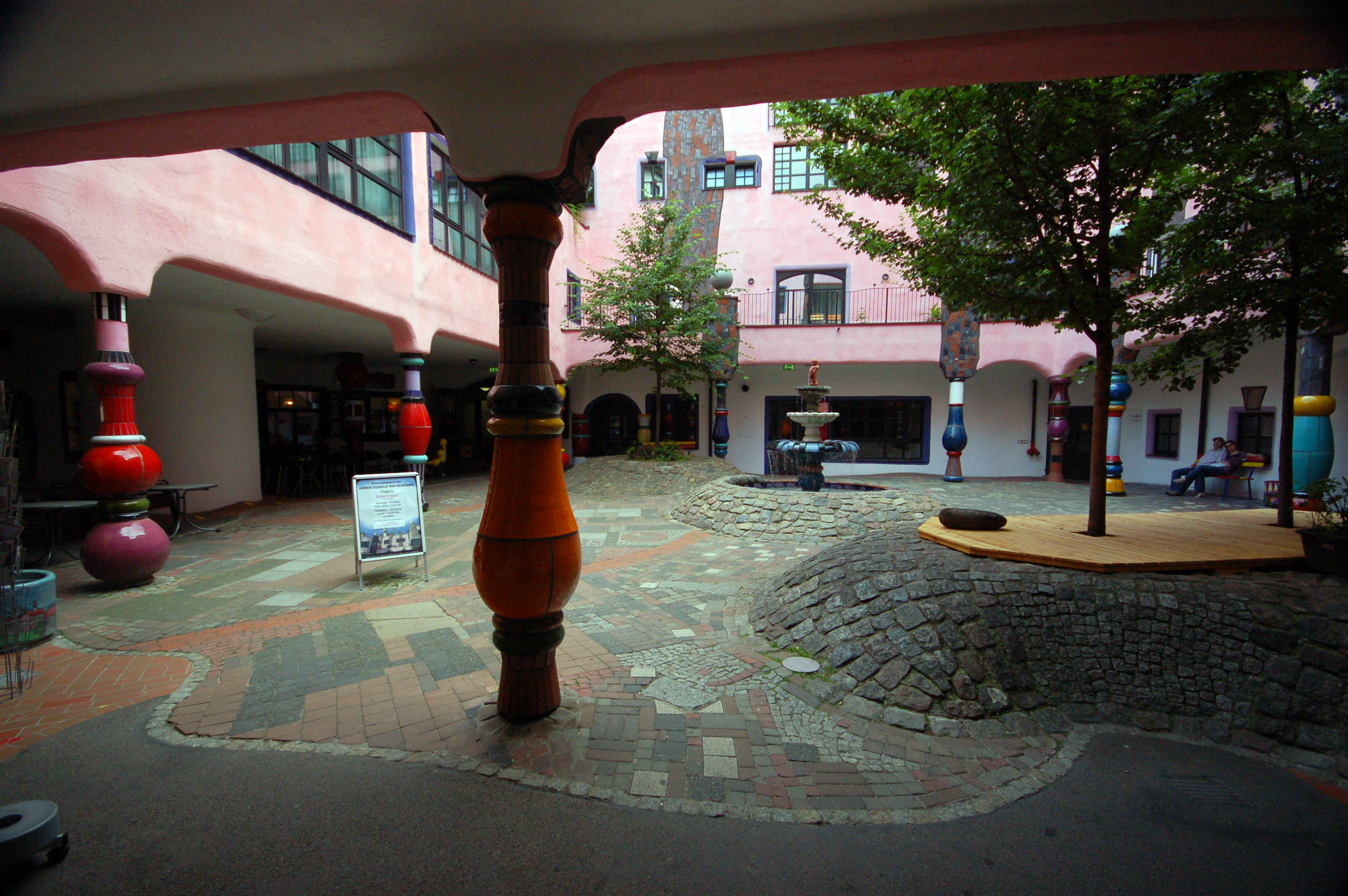
View into courtyard

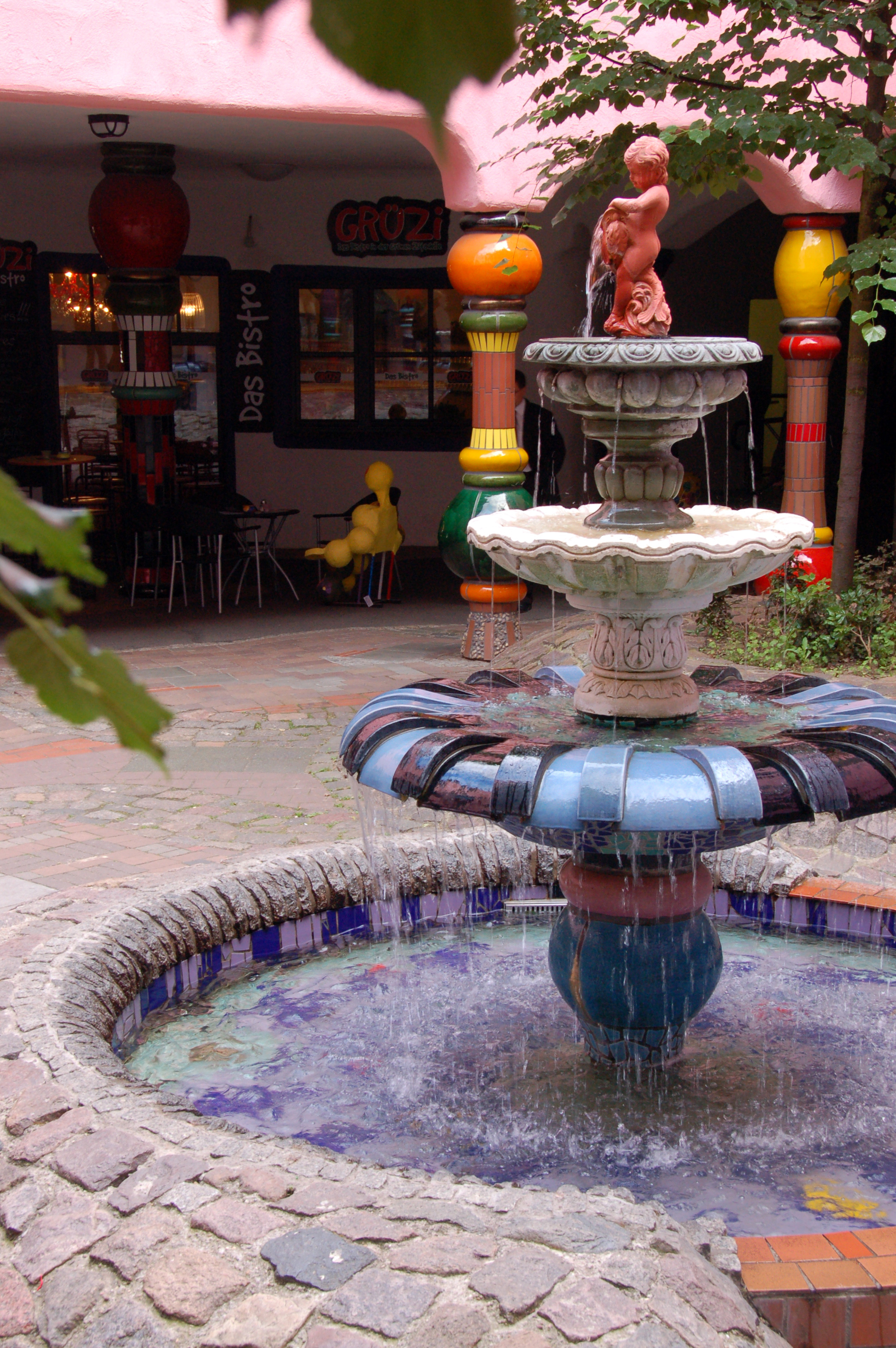
View of the fountain

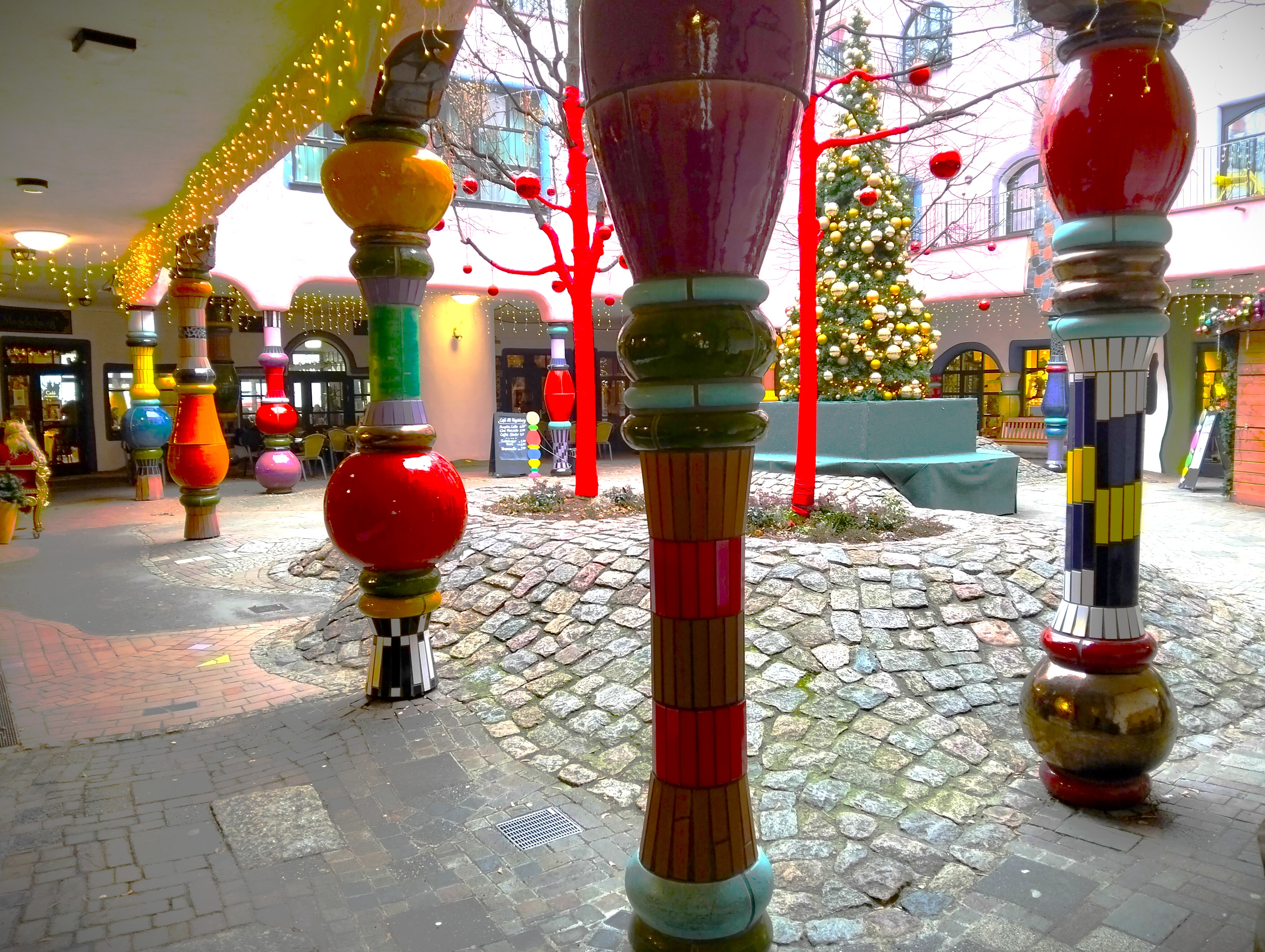

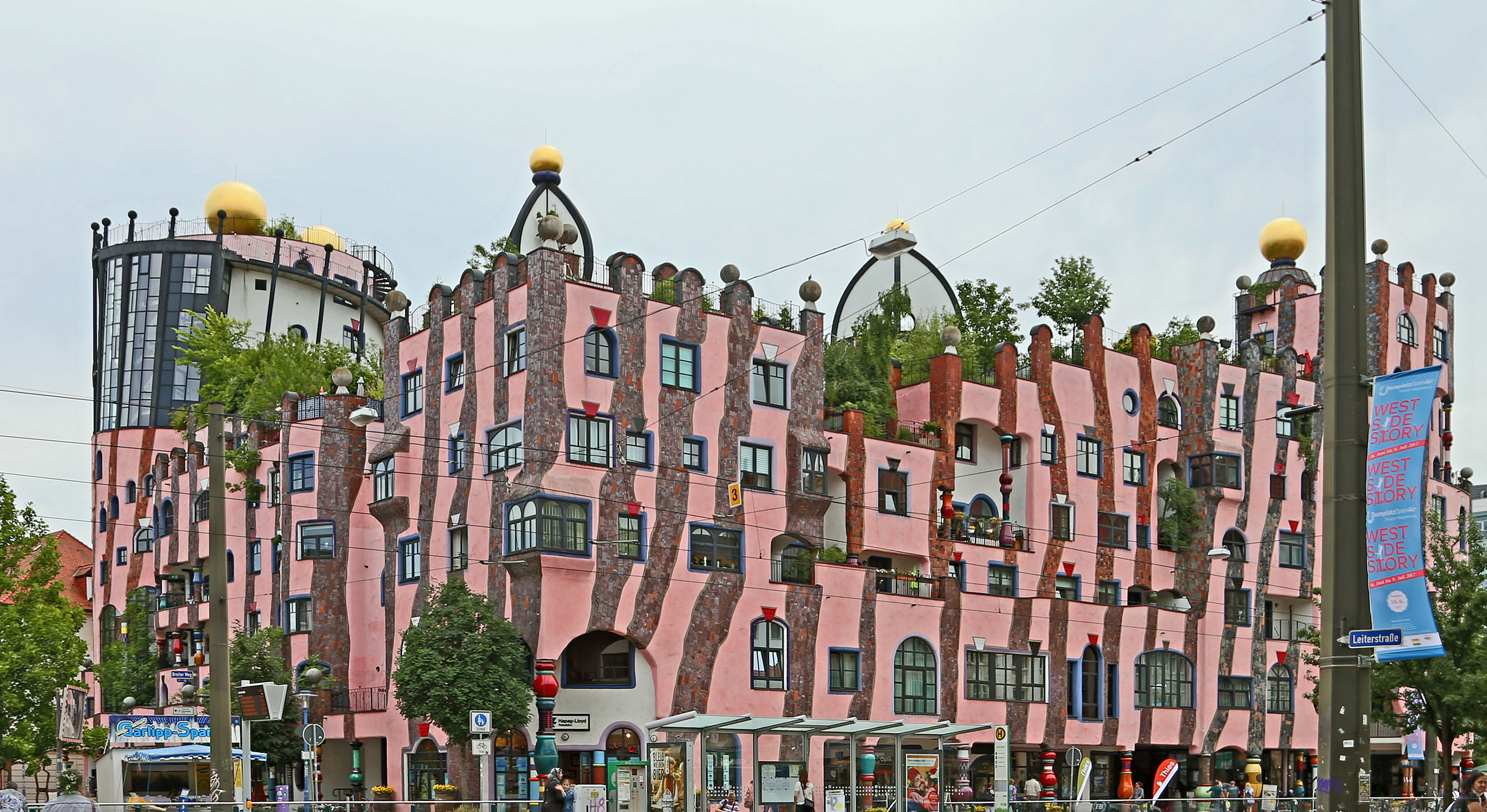

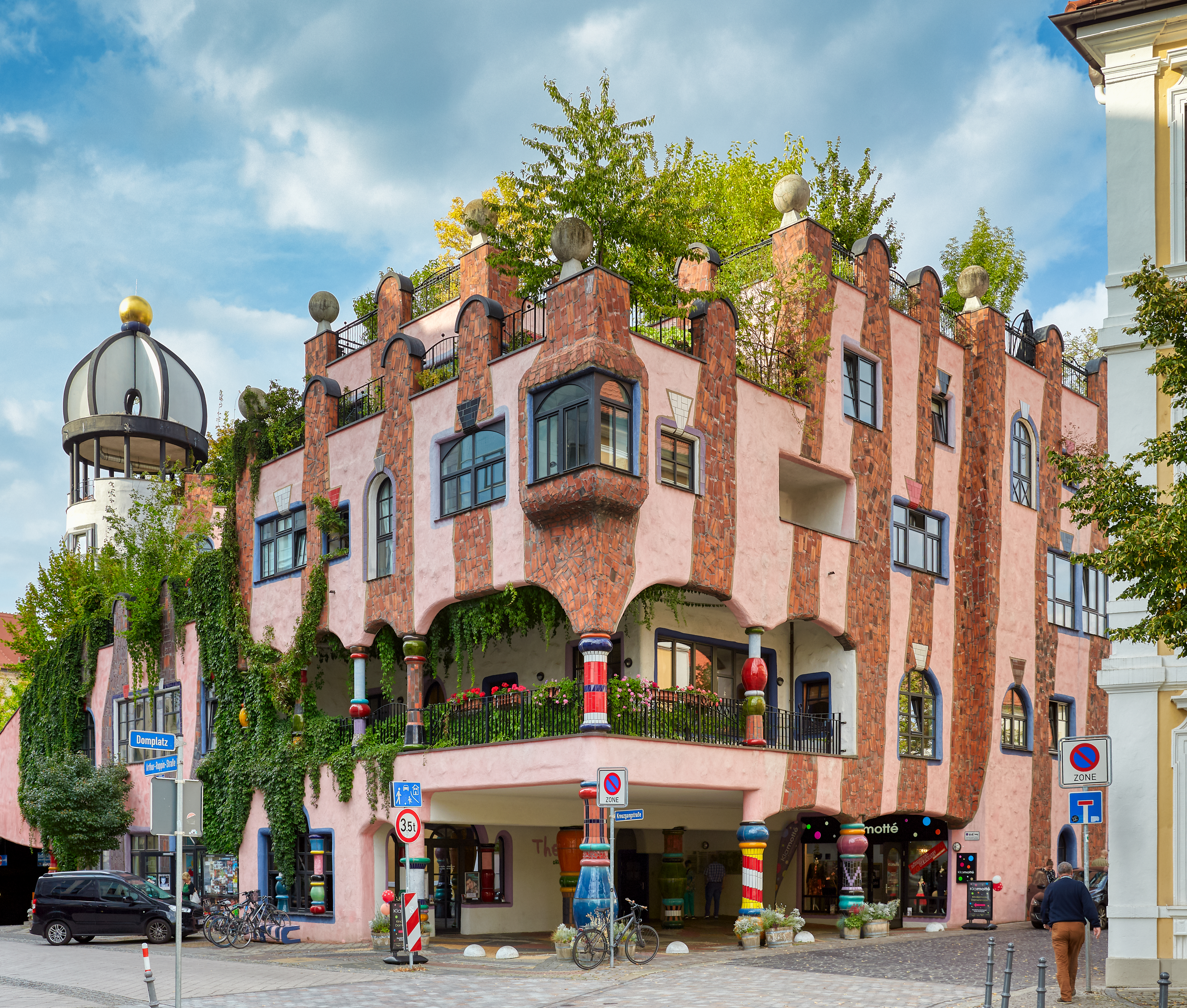

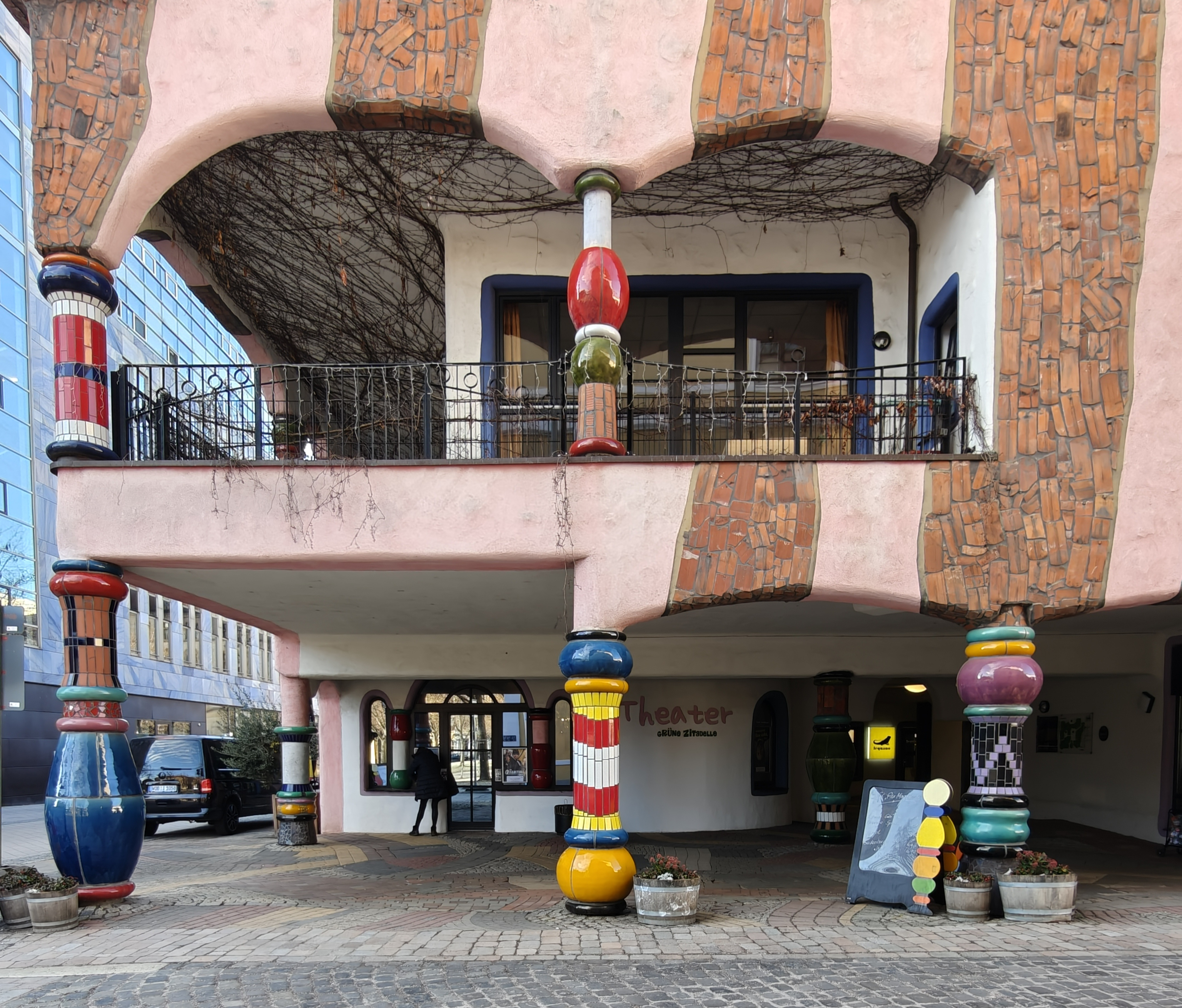

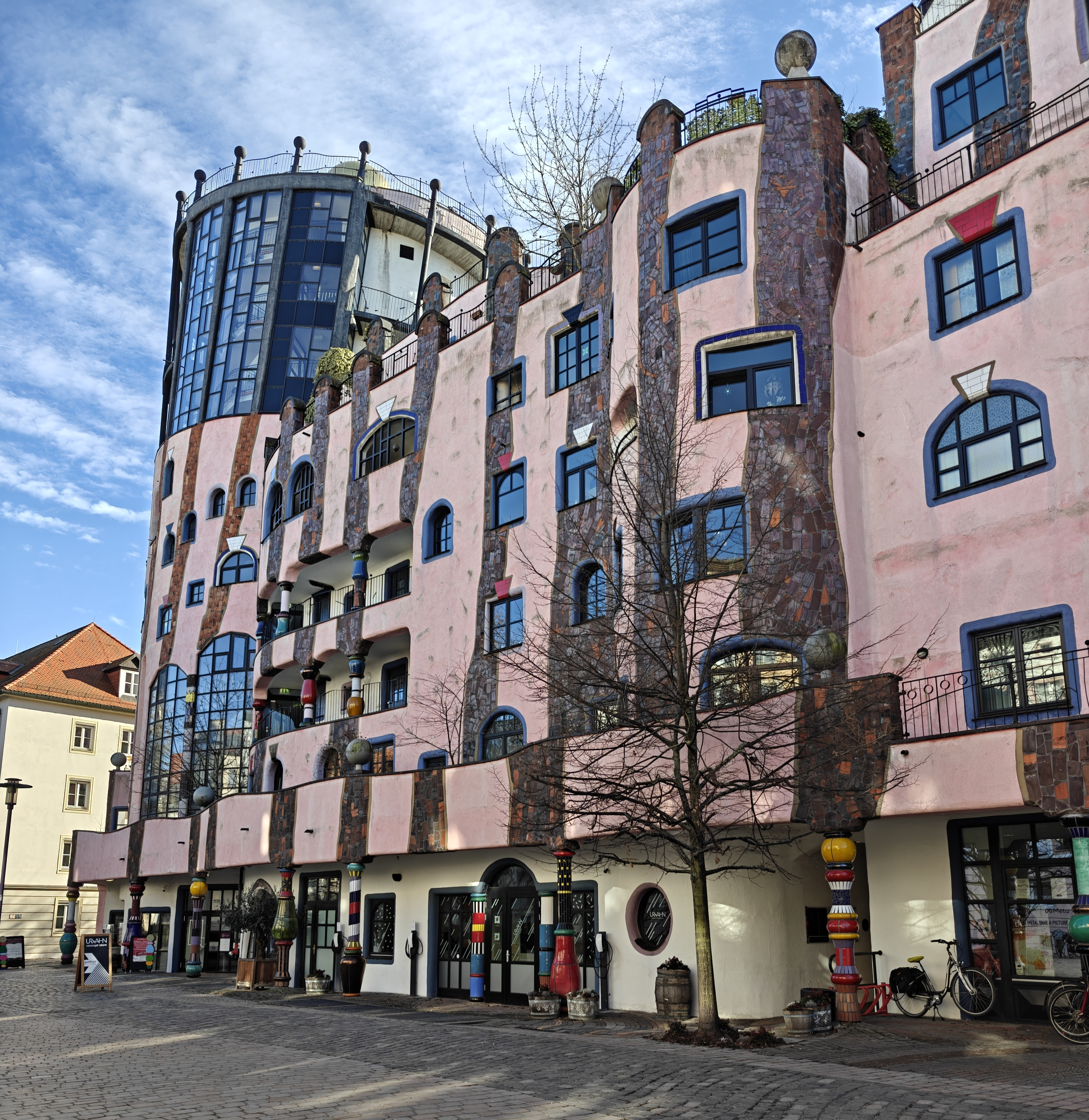

Wide lens view of courtyard
