= Influencia de las ideas modernas =

1916 Puerto Rican book

- Author: Luisa Capetillo
- Language: Spanish
- Publisher: Negrón Flores Press
- Publication date: 1916

Influencia de las ideas modernas (transl. 'The Influence of Modern Ideas') is a 1916 book by Puerto Rican anarchist Luisa Capetillo. Primarily written in Ybor City, Florida, it was published in San Juan by Negrón Flores Press. A multi-genre work, it consists of letters, notes, personal narratives, plays, and short stories.

== Sources ==
- Hewitt, Nancy A. (2005). "Luisa Capetillo: Feminist of the Working Class". In Ruíz, Vicki; Korrol, Virginia Sánchez (eds.). Latina Legacies: Identity, Biography, and Community. New York: Oxford University Press. pp. 120–134. ISBN 978-0-19-515398-9.
- Ramos, Julio (1991). "Luisa Capetillo: Una escritura entre mas de dos" [Luisa Capetillo: A writer between more than two]. Revista de Crítica Literaria Latinoamericana (in Spanish). 17 (33): 235. doi:10.2307/4530539.
- Ramos, Julio, ed. (2022). "Cronología mínima de Capetillo" [Short Chronology of Capetillo]. Amor y anarquía: Escritos de Luisa Capetillo [Love and Anarchy: Writings of Luisa Capetillo] (in Spanish). Cabo Rojo: Editora Educación Emergente. pp. 55–56.
- Townsend, Sarah J. (2008). "After Death (Luisa Capetillo)". In Taylor, Diana; Townsend, Sarah J. (eds.). Stages of Conflict: A Critical Anthology of Latin American Theater and Performance. Ann Arbor: University of Michigan Press. ISBN 978-0-472-05027-7.
