= Luisa Capetillo =

Puerto Rican labor organizer (1882–1922)

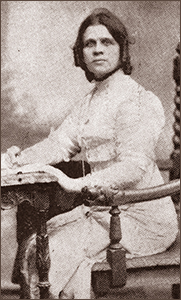
- Portrait of Capetillo, c. 1913
- Born: Luisa Capetillo Perón; October 28, 1882 (Note: Capetillo biographer Norma Valle Ferrer claims that she was born in 1879. Researcher Teresa Peña Jordán states, based on archival research, that she was born in 1882. A photocopy of a form filled out by Capetillo with the 1882 birthdate is featured in her paper "Luisa Capetillo: una práctica del cuerpo, el pensamiento y la palabra".); Arecibo, Puerto Rico, Spanish Empire
- Died: April 10, 1922 (aged 39); Río Piedras, Puerto Rico
- Occupations: Writer, labor organizer, journalist

Luisa Capetillo Perón (October 28, 1882 – April 10, 1922) was a Puerto Rican labor organizer, writer, journalist, and cigar factory reader. She organized workers in Puerto Rico, the Republic of Cuba, the Dominican Republic, and the United States. She also published four books in her lifetime, covering a wide variety of forms, genres, and topics. As an anarcha-feminist and social anarchist, she advocated for free love, universal education, women's rights, and collective ownership of scientific advances while opposing state control.

Capetillo was born in Arecibo, in the Captaincy General of Puerto Rico. Her father taught her to read and write, and she read extensively, including works by influential political thinkers. In 1897, she took Manuel Ledesma, the son of a wealthy aristocrat, as her lover. The two separated in 1900, but their relationship influenced her later feminist works. She began writing for the local newspaper in 1904, and in 1905, she became involved with the Free Federation of Workers (Spanish: Federación Libre de Trabajadores de Puerto Rico, FLT), an anarcho-syndicalist union, helping organize an agricultural strike in Arecibo. In 1906, she became a reader at a cigar factory, reading to the cigar makers as they worked and meeting members of the FLT-affiliated Federation of Tobacco Rollers (Spanish: Federación de Torcedores de Tabaco, FTT), becoming a leader in the FLT over time. Starting in 1912, she moved across the Atlantic and Caribbean, writing and organizing workers. In 1915, she was arrested in Cuba for wearing trousers and deported back to Puerto Rico. She continued to travel and organize until her death in 1922.

Interest in Capetillo's life surged in 1990 with the publication of the biography Luisa Capetillo, historia de una mujer proscrita (transl. Luisa Capetillo, History of an Outlawed Woman) by journalist Norma Valle Ferrer. After this, Capetillo became the subject of a docudrama series, and in 2014, the Legislative Assembly of Puerto Rico honored her with a plaque in the Plaza in Honor of Puerto Rican Women in San Juan. She is considered one of Puerto Rico's first feminists and, according to historian Jorrell A. Meléndez-Badillo, she was an influential node in an anarchist "counter-republic of letters": a network of writers who used their writing as a form of political struggle.

== Early life ==
Luisa Capetillo Perón was born on October 28, 1882, in Arecibo, Puerto Rico—at the time part of the Spanish Empire. Her mother and father both moved there from Europe in the mid-1870s seeking economic opportunity. Her father, a Spaniard named Luis Capetillo Echevarría, worked as an administrator at an amusement park. When he ran into financial problems, he found employment as a seasonal laborer in various industries, including agriculture, construction, and dock work. Her mother, a Frenchwoman named Luisa Margarita Perón, (Note: Originally Perone. Perón was a hispanicization.) worked as a governess for a wealthy family before becoming a laundry worker. The two were cohabiting but not legally married when Luisa was born. Capetillo was baptized at the Cathedral of St. Philip the Apostle on June 24, 1890, when she was seven years old.

Capetillo's father taught her to read and write, though he left Capetillo and her mother sometime during her teenage years and never returned. She also received some formal schooling, including at the Doña María Sierra Soler private school, where she received diplomas in geography, grammar, history, religious history, and reading. She read extensively, including works by political thinkers such as George Sand, John Stuart Mill, Madeleine Vernet, and Peter Kropotkin.

Capetillo often accompanied her mother to the wealthy estates at which she worked. One of these estates belonged to Don Gregorio Ledesma, the marquess of Arecibo and the leader of the Unconditional Spanish Party, which represented the interests of conservative Spaniards on the island. There, Capetillo met Gregorio's son Manuel, and Manuel's friend Dr. Susoni, who competed for her affections. Capetillo and Manuel became lovers in 1897. That year, Capetillo gave birth to the couple's first child, Manuela. Manuel also inherited his father's properties and title. Around 1899, Capetillo gave birth to a second child, Gregorio. The children lived with Capetillo's mother while Capetillo herself moved between her family home and the Ledesma estate. Capetillo and Manuel's relationship was loving but turbulent. He expected her to be a dutiful wife and mother and to remain home at all times. They separated for unclear reasons around 1900. (Note: Historian Nancy A. Hewitt theorizes that after the Spanish–American War and the passage of the Foraker Act, under which the United States government asserted control of Puerto Rico as an unincorporated territory, unconventional, inter-class relationships such as theirs were less likely to be tolerated. Valle Ferrer also theorizes that the class difference between Capetillo and Manuel may have contributed to the end of their relationship, alongside Capetillo's frustration with being trapped in the house.) After the end of the relationship, Capetillo and Manuel initially remained on friendly terms, with Manuel legally recognizing their children, providing financial support for them, and enrolling Manuela in boarding school. Capetillo's relationship with Manuel influenced her later feminist writings, in which she regularly discusses the love she felt for him and the nature of their relationship.

== Journalism and early organizing ==
Capetillo began writing for the local Arecibo newspaper in 1904. Her writings were pro-trade union and influenced by anarchist thought. In January 1905, she helped organize an agricultural workers' strike in the town, leading marches and reading to striking workers from atop benches in the local plaza. This strike was part of a broader agricultural strike in northern Puerto Rico led by the Free Federation of Workers (Spanish: Federación Libre de Trabajadores de Puerto Rico, FLT), an anarcho-syndicalist union. During the strike in Arecibo, police threatened to shoot into the crowds of striking workers. When it ended in February, workers received a 15–30% wage increase and a ten-hour workday, though they had initially asked for eight hours.

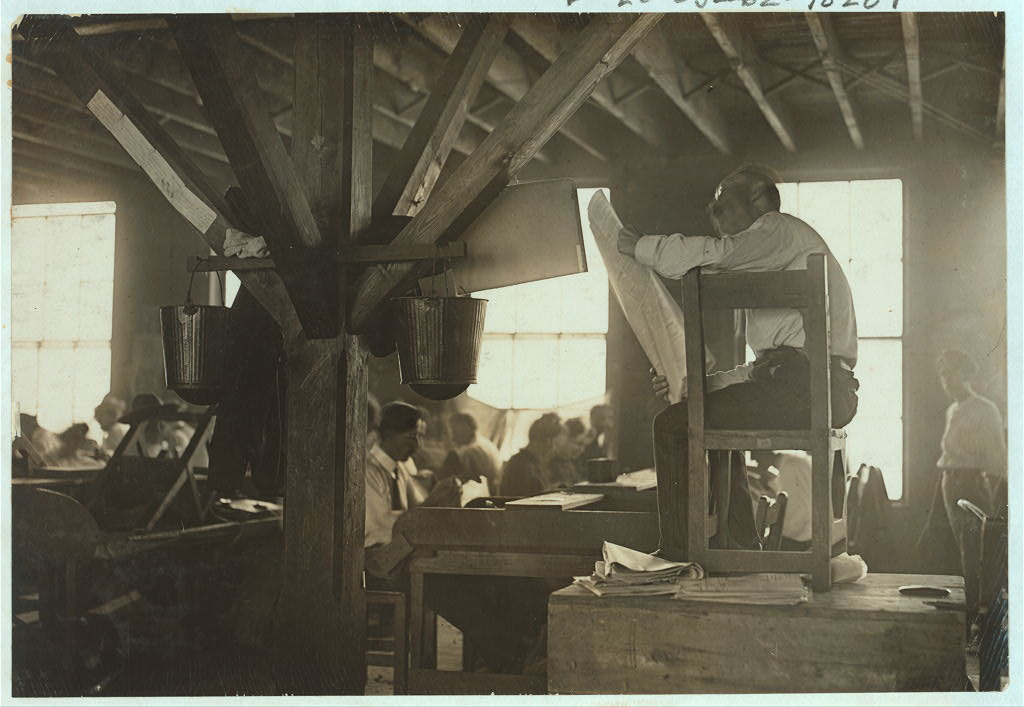
A reader in a cigar factory. Capetillo worked as a reader in Puerto Rico and possibly the United States.

In 1906, Capetillo became a reader at a cigar factory. Cigar factory readers stood on elevated platforms to read newspapers and other literature to cigar makers as they worked. She also worked independently as a seamstress, making blouses and handkerchiefs from her home. As a reader, Capetillo encountered members of the labor movement, including members of the Federation of Tobacco Rollers (Spanish: Federación de Torcedores de Tabaco, FTT), an affiliate of the FLT. She became a prominent FLT leader, traveling throughout Puerto Rico to gain support from workers and other labor leaders. In 1907, she published her first book, Ensayos libertarios (transl. 'Libertarian Essays'), in which she advocates for an egalitarian society, portrays life as a conflict between workers and capitalists, and accuses the clergy of hypocrisy and selfishness. As she became more involved in the labor movement, her relationship with Manuel soured. He withdrew his financial support from her and took custody of their children, barring her from seeing them.

Capetillo participated in the FLT's Fifth Workers' Congress in 1908. Women's suffrage was debated at the congress, with Capetillo arguing that the union should support all women's right to vote. While some wealthy and middle-class women argued that suffrage should only be granted to educated, literate women, the union ultimately supported universal suffrage, becoming one of its strongest supporters in Puerto Rico during the early twentieth century. In 1909, Capetillo helped promote the magazine Unión Obrera (transl. 'Labor Union'), for which she wrote, and began publishing her own magazine, La Mujer (transl. 'The Woman'). She also helped organize the FLT's Cruzada del Ideal (transl. 'Crusade for Ideals'), traveling across the island to host workshops and talk to workers about the union.

In 1910, Capetillo published her second book, La humanidad en el futuro (transl. 'Humanity in the Future'), a utopian story about a general strike. She published her third book, Mi opinión sobre las libertades, derechos y deberes de la mujer como compañera, madre y ser independiente (transl. 'My Opinion on the Freedoms, Rights, and Duties of Women as Partners, Mothers, and Independent Beings', henceforth Mi opinión...), in 1911. The book includes essays discussing marriage, sex education, sex work, women's history, and women's rights. Capetillo also began a relationship with a married pharmacist in Arecibo around 1911, giving birth to her third child, Luis. Because Luis's father was already married, he refused to recognize Luis as his son. As a result, Luis went to live at Capetillo's mother's home.

== Transnational activism ==
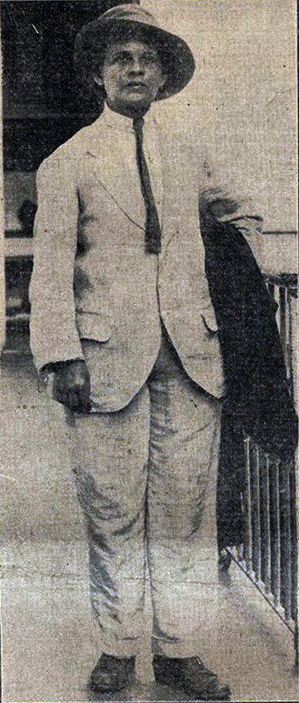
Capetillo wearing masculine clothing.

Capetillo moved to New York City in 1912. This move was part of a broader migration of Puerto Ricans to New York during the early twentieth century. While living there, she met Hispanic cigar makers and wrote for the anarchist newspapers Cultura Obrera (transl. 'Working Class Culture'), Brazo y cerebro (transl. 'Muscle and Mind'), and Fuerza consciente (transl. 'Conscious Power'). In 1913, she moved to Ybor City, Florida, where many Hispanic cigar makers lived and worked. She lived with a German machinist there and probably worked as a reader, (Note: Hewitt and researcher Araceli Tinajero both say that she worked as a reader in Ybor City. Valle Ferrer says that "it is unknown whether she worked as a reader while living there, but she probably did, since she was recognized for her work as a reader in Puerto Rico".) forming close working relationships with other labor organizers.

In 1914, Capetillo moved to Cuba, where she lived in Havana and Cárdenas. She worked with the Anarchist Federation of Cuba, drawing the suspicion of local authorities due to her connections with anarchist and labor activists. In 1915, she helped organize a sugarcane workers' strike, publicly advocated for the establishment of worker cooperatives, and supported an anarchist manifesto denouncing the Cuban government's repression of organized labor. Because of these activities, Cuban President Mario García Menocal ordered her deportation.

Unrelated to the deportation order, Capetillo was arrested for wearing trousers in public on July 24, 1915. According to researcher Araceli Tinajero, the arresting officer claimed that her attire was "immoral" and "causing a scene". Press reactions to her arrest were split. Mainstream papers ridiculed her and the anarchist movement in general, while the radical press defended her right to dress how she wanted. At her trial, Capetillo argued that no law forbade women from wearing trousers and that trousers were more comfortable and hygienic for modern working women. The judge was rendered speechless. He released her, but she was deported to Puerto Rico in 1916.

=== Return to Puerto Rico ===
Upon returning to Puerto Rico, Capetillo published Influencia de las ideas modernas (transl. 'The Influence of Modern Ideas'), most of which she had written in Ybor City. A multi-genre work, it consists of letters, notes, personal narratives, plays, and short stories. In 1917, she helped lead an agricultural workers' strike in Patillas, during which she was clubbed by a police officer at a protest. She helped lead another strike in Ceiba in 1918. 30,000 FLT members took part in this strike, with Capetillo organizing rallies along the coast. During one of these rallies, on March 29, 1918, she was arrested for inciting a riot. Her US$400 bail (roughly equivalent to $9,000 in 2025) was paid for by local workers. In 1919, she helped lead another strike in Vieques.

=== Further travels ===
In 1919, Capetillo was invited to travel to Santo Domingo in the Dominican Republic to speak at an event hosted by the local Free Federation of Workers (Spanish: Federación Libre de Trabajadores) (Note: Not to be confused with the Puerto Rican FLT) during a cobblers' strike. After refusing a local censor's demand to read her speech in advance, Capetillo was barred from speaking but did help collect money for the workers' strike fund. Capetillo also traveled to New York in 1919, possibly living there for some time. (Note: Valle Ferrer and Hewitt say that she commuted between New York and Puerto Rico during this time. Tinajero and independent researcher Julio Ramos say that she lived there.) While there, she ran a boarding house where political gatherings took place, published in the labor press, and might have worked as a reader. She also sought support from Samuel Gompers, the leader of the American Federation of Labor (AFL), for an agricultural farm school to educate poor Puerto Rican children. Gompers gave her funds to create the school, but the project was blocked by Puerto Rican authorities who thought that the school's funds should come from Puerto Ricans, not Americans.

== Later life and death ==
By 1920 or 1921, (Note: 1920 according to Valle Ferrer; 1921 according to Hewitt.) Capetillo had returned to Puerto Rico. There, she campaigned for the Socialist Party, which supported universal suffrage. Capetillo's biographer Norma Valle Ferrer states that this was "an apparent contradiction of her anarchist ideals", as classical anarchists opposed electoralism in favor of spontaneous revolution. Her reasons for supporting the party are unknown.

While living in a small, under-construction house in Buen Consejo, Capetillo suffered an attack of tuberculosis, which she had contracted during her travels abroad. On April 10, 1922, accompanied by her son Luis, she went to the municipal hospital in Río Piedras, where she died. A delegation of FLT organizers accompanied her body back to her house, and she was buried in the municipal cemetery the next day.

== Views ==
=== Anarchism ===
Freedom is my country. Truth is my motto. Universal fraternity is my goal.

— Luisa Capetillo, from Mi opinión..., quoted in Luisa Capetillo, Pioneer Puerto Rican Feminist by Norma Valle Ferrer

In Mi opinión..., Capetillo identifies herself as a socialist anarchist, arguing for collective ownership of "advances, discoveries, and inventions" while opposing state control. This reflected the views of the majority of Puerto Rican workers at the time. According to researcher Stephanie Rivera Berruz, Capetillo was drawn to anarchism because it was "a political philosophy put into action". Valle Ferrer states that she was also influenced by "Romantic anarchists" like Errico Malatesta and Leo Tolstoy. Philosophically, Capetillo believed that humans are naturally kind and support equality but that they are corrupted by the social systems in which they live. Drawing on anarcho-syndicalist principles, she supported organized labor movements and the general strike as a tool for disrupting these systems.

Because of her anti-state views, Capetillo opposed the independence movement in Puerto Rico, viewing it as an oppressive force. She criticized the Puerto Rican Unionist Party, accusing them of being "egoists, exploiters, and aristocrats" who oppressed the island's workers. Rivera Berruz argues that Capetillo's views on nationhood and the state were influenced by Puerto Rico's colonial status and her own status as a transnational migrant.

=== Women's rights and free love ===
Capetillo is often considered the first feminist writer from Puerto Rico. According to Rivera Berruz, Capetillo articulated feminist ideas long before the rise of what philosopher Francesca Gargallo considers the mainstream feminist movement in the 1960s. She is also frequently associated with anarcha-feminism, a movement opposing government and patriarchal authority. In her work, she draws links between women's liberation and organized labor, advocating for an egalitarian system for men and women workers. She also calls for greater sexual freedom for women, describing women's sexual desire as being as natural as hunger and sleep. She believed that motherhood was an essential aspect of womanhood, stating after giving birth to her first child that "a woman will always be a mother, even if she doesn't have children".

Capetillo advocated for free love. In her view, free love was the union of two people unrestrained by legal contracts and social conventions about families. She defined love as a union of free people, with free love being marked by mutual love, respect, and support. If either partner fell out of love, Capetillo believed that the relationship should end. She called marriage the "prostitution of love". In her view, marriage forced women into passive roles and prevented them from exiting relationships, limiting their freedom and hence their ability to love. Many anarchists advocated for free love, both in Puerto Rico and abroad. However, Capetillo's emphasis on women's exploitation in critiquing the institution of marriage was unique among anarchists and labor activists.

=== Religion ===
Capetillo was a Christian, but she denounced organized religion throughout her life. In an essay from Ensayos libertarios, she accuses the church of "trickery" and "hypocrisy", as well as wealth hoarding. She believed that Mass and other religious ceremonies were primarily ways for wealthy women to show off their clothing and jewelry. Capetillo's ideal Christian tended to the poor and sick instead of attending Mass. While she was baptized as a child, she never baptized her own children, calling it a "denigrating mark". Valle Ferrer argues that Capetillo's Christian beliefs were influenced by Tolstoy, who was a Christian anarchist.

Capetillo was also influenced by Kardecist spiritism. She believed in reincarnation, a spiritual body distinct from the physical, and a "plurality of habitable worlds". Ensayos libertarios begins with a quote from spiritist Camille Flammarion, a collaborator and friend of Allan Kardec. Kardecist spiritists of the nineteenth century often called for liberty, equality, and fraternity, and researcher Carmen Ana Romeu Toro states that Capetillo was drawn to spiritism because it championed these values, among others.

=== Education ===
Capetillo viewed education as being essential to human liberation, allowing people to unlearn harmful ideas they received from society. In one essay from Ensayos libertarios, Capetillo argues for universal education without class or gender distinctions. She also advocated specifically for women's education. In her view, women's education would bring greater financial and intellectual independence. She believed that women's education should include the arts, sciences, and humanities, as well as discussion of women's sexual desires.

=== Health and hygiene ===
In the collection Influencia de las ideas modernas, Capetillo recommends various health and personal hygiene practices. These include exercise, daily baths, and Eastern-inspired meditation. She also advocates for moderation in drinking and smoking, as well as a vegetarian diet. At her New York boarding house, she served vegetarian food.

== Legacy ==
In Capetillo's obituary, which was published in Justicia (transl. 'Justice'), the FLT newspaper, editors compared her to revolutionary activists Louise Michel and Rosa Luxemburg. At the same time, they called her personality "semi-errant" and her advocacy for vegetarianism and love-based politics childish. Historian Vicki L. Ruiz theorizes that labor organizer Luisa Moreno (born Blanca Rosa Rodríguez López), who also organized cigar workers in Florida in 1936, adopted the name "Luisa" in honor of Capetillo.

Interest in Capetillo's life surged with the publication of Valle Ferrer's biography, Luisa Capetillo, historia de una mujer proscrita (transl. 'Luisa Capetillo, History of an Outlawed Woman') in 1990. Two years later, in 1992, the book Amor y anarquía: los escritos de Luisa Capetillo (transl. 'Love and Anarchy: Writings of Luisa Capetillo'), one of the few books at the time to include excerpts of Capetillo's writings, was published. Led by Gloria Waldman-Schwartz, a team of students at the University of Puerto Rico produced an English translation of Valle Ferrer's biography of Capetillo, Luisa Capetillo, Pioneer Puerto Rican Feminist, in 2006.

In 1994, a docudrama series called Luisa Capetillo, Pasión de justicia (transl. 'Luisa Capetillo, Passion of Justice') was released. Directed by Sonia Fritz, the series is based on Valle Ferrer's biography of Capetillo. In 2013, the play Influencia de las ideas modernas was staged at the Celébrate Theater in San Juan, Puerto Rico. On May 29, 2014, the Legislative Assembly of Puerto Rico honored Capetillo alongside 12 other women with plaques in the Plaza in Honor of Puerto Rican Women in San Juan.

Valle Ferrer considers Capetillo "the first woman to successfully challenge prevailing prejudices against women by becoming an important labor leader and advocate for women and the poor". According to her, many workers remember her for her "indomitable bravery" but ridicule her sexual politics. The image of Capetillo wearing a pantsuit is popular in art and on commercial products.

=== Literary scholarship ===
Historian Jorrell A. Meléndez-Badillo states that Capetillo formed part of an anarchist "counter-republic of letters": a network of writers who used their writing as a form of political struggle. Independent researcher Julio Ramos lists Capetillo as one of several twentieth-century Puerto Rican writers who challenged the idea that writing was an upper-class activity. Researcher Nancy Bird-Soto states that Capetillo's writing reflects her "subversive nonconformism". According to Bird-Soto, Capetillo's nonconformism stemmed from her anarchist beliefs and her marginalized status as a Caribbean woman. In taking a nonconformist position, Bird-Soto argues, Capetillo challenges the colonial power structure by "proposing emancipated ways of being Puerto Rican".

Researcher Araceli Tinajero states that Capetillo's career as a reader influenced her writing, with her early work being "written to be read aloud". Bird-Soto and Othoniel Rosa agree with this assessment. Bird-Soto describes Capetillo's writing as "urgent", with syntax that is sometimes difficult to grasp. She argues that this reflects the patterns of oral speech, as "listeners at the factory would not have to concern themselves too much to think about sentence clauses". Rivera Berruz also argues that Capetillo's style was designed to connect with her working-class audience and that she used popular genres such as drama and prose to spread her ideas.

Utopias are a common theme in Capetillo's work. La humanidad en el futuro is a utopian novel about a general strike. According to researcher Othoniel Rosa, La humanidad en el futuro "respects the conventions of the genre" and references other utopian stories published around the same time. In the prologue to Mi opinión..., Capetillo admits that her commitment to her ideals is "utopic", but argues that a society based around them is possible. The play Influencia de las ideas modernas, from the collection of the same name, also features a utopian, egalitarian vision of society as envisioned by classical anarchists like Kropotkin.

== Bibliography ==
- Ensayos libertarios (1907, transl. 'Libertarian Essays')
- La humanidad en el futuro (1910, transl. 'Humanity in the Future')
- Mi opinión sobre las libertades, derechos y deberes de la mujer como compañera, madre y ser independiente (1911, transl. 'My Opinion on the Freedoms, Rights, and Duties of Women as Partners, Mothers, and Independent Beings')
- Influencia de las ideas modernas (1916, transl. 'The Influence of Modern Ideas')

== See also ==
- Anarchism in Puerto Rico
- Puerto Rican literature
- History of women in Puerto Rico

== Sources ==
- Bird-Soto, Nancy (2022). "Reading Luisa Capetillo". Small Axe. 26 (3): 74–83. doi:10.1215/07990537-10211878. ISSN 0799-0537.
- Duffy Ponsa, Christina (2015). "When Statehood Was Autonomy". In Neuman, Gerald L.; Brown-Nagin, Tomiko (eds.). Reconsidering the Insular Cases: The Past and Future of the American Empire. Cambridge: Harvard University Press. pp. 1–28. doi:10.2307/j.ctvjz81gw. ISBN 978-0-9861062-4-8.
- Gay, Kathlyn; Gay, Martin (1999). "Anarcha-Feminism". Encyclopedia of Political Anarchy. Santa Barbara: ABC-CLIO. p. 6. ISBN 978-0-87436-982-3.
- Gay, Kathlyn; Gay, Martin (1999). "Anarcho-Syndicalism". Encyclopedia of Political Anarchy. Santa Barbara: ABC-CLIO. p. 16. ISBN 978-0-87436-982-3.
- Hewitt, Nancy A. (2005). "Luisa Capetillo: Feminist of the Working Class". In Ruíz, Vicki; Korrol, Virginia Sánchez (eds.). Latina Legacies: Identity, Biography, and Community. New York: Oxford University Press. pp. 120–134. ISBN 978-0-19-515398-9.
- Isaia, Artur Cesar (2009). "Spiritism and the Proclamation of the Republic in Brazil". Öt Kontinens (1): 219–233. ISSN 1589-3839.
- Meléndez-Badillo, Jorell A. (2015). "Imagining Resistance: Organizing the Puerto Rican Southern Agricultural Strike of 1905". Caribbean Studies. 43 (2): 33–81. ISSN 0008-6533. JSTOR 44114611.
- Meléndez-Badillo, Jorell A. (2022). "Luisa Capetillo and the Counter-Republic of Letters". Small Axe. 26 (3): 112–120. doi:10.1215/07990537-10211709. ISSN 0799-0537.
- Othoniel Rosa, Luis (2022). "Luisa Capetillo and the Pedagogy of Unruliness". Small Axe. 26 (3): 84–97. doi:10.1215/07990537-10211892. ISSN 0799-0537.
- Peña Jordán, Teresa (2022). "Luisa Capetillo: una práctica del cuerpo, el pensamiento y la palabra" [Luisa Capetillo: A Practice of Body, Thought and Word]. In Ramos, Julio (ed.). Amor y anarquía: Escritos de Luisa Capetillo [Love and Anarchy: Writings of Luisa Capetillo] (in Spanish). Cabo Rojo: Editora Educación Emergente. pp. 161–173.
- Peña Lopez, Brena I. (2014). "Asamblea Legislativa rinde homenaje a 12 mujeres ilustres" [Legislative Assembly Pays Tribute to 12 Illustrious Women]. Primera Hora (in Spanish).
- Ramos, Julio, ed. (2022a). "Prólogo (post-2019) a la nueva edición de Amor y anarquía: escritos de Luisa Capetillo" [Prologue (post-2019) to the new edition of Love and anarchy: writings by Luisa Capetillo]. Amor y anarquía: Escritos de Luisa Capetillo [Love and Anarchy: Writings of Luisa Capetillo] (in Spanish). Cabo Rojo: Editora Educación Emergente. pp. 13–24.
- Ramos, Julio, ed. (2022b). "Cronología mínima de Capetillo" [Short Chronology of Capetillo]. Amor y anarquía: Escritos de Luisa Capetillo [Love and Anarchy: Writings of Luisa Capetillo] (in Spanish). Cabo Rojo: Editora Educación Emergente. pp. 55–56.
- Ramos, Julio (2022c). "The Legacies of Luisa Capetillo". Small Axe. 26 (3): 68–73. doi:10.1215/07990537-10211864. ISSN 0799-0537.
- Rivera Berruz, Stephanie (2018). "Writing to be Heard: Recovering the Philosophy of Luisa Capetillo". Essays in Philosophy. 19 (1). doi:10.7710/1526-0569.1595.
- Rodríguez-Silva, Ileana M. (2012). Silencing Race: Disentangling Blackness, Colonialism, and National Identities in Puerto Rico. New York: Springer. ISBN 978-1-137-26322-3.
- Romeu Toro, Carmen Ana (2022). "Luisa Capetillo: anarquista y espiritista puertorriqueña" [Luisa Capetillo: Puerto Rican Anarchist and Spiritist]. In Ramos, Julio (ed.). Amor y anarquía: Escritos de Luisa Capetillo [Love and Anarchy: Writings of Luisa Capetillo] (in Spanish). Cabo Rojo: Editora Educación Emergente. pp. 203–213.
- Ruiz, Vicki L. (2005). "Luisa Moreno and Latina Labor Activism". In Ruiz, Vicki L.; Sánchez Korrol, Virginia (eds.). Latina Legacies: Identity, Biography, and Community. New York: Oxford University Press. pp. 175–192. ISBN 978-0-19-515399-6.
- Sanabria, Carlos (2017). Puerto Rican Labor History, 1898–1934: Revolutionary Ideals and Reformist Politics. Lanham, Maryland: Bloomsbury. ISBN 978-1-4985-3784-1.
- Tinajero, Araceli (2010). El Lector: A History of the Cigar Factory Reader. Austin: University of Texas Press. ISBN 978-0-292-72175-3.
- Townsend, Sarah J. (2008). "After Death (Luisa Capetillo)". In Taylor, Diana; Townsend, Sarah J. (eds.). Stages of Conflict: A Critical Anthology of Latin American Theater and Performance. Ann Arbor: University of Michigan Press. pp. 136–140. ISBN 978-0-472-05027-7.
- Valle Ferrer, Norma (2006). Luisa Capetillo, Pioneer Puerto Rican Feminist. Translated by Waldman-Schwartz, Gloria. New York: Peter Lang. ISBN 978-0-8204-4285-3. NOTE: While Waldman-Schwartz is listed as the official translator, the book was actually translated by a team of students led by her. These students include Carolyn F. Castro Báez, Verónica Cabrera Velarde, Carmen M. Espada, Ivonne López, Zaida M. Negrón, Eunice Rodríguez, and María B. Vásquez Lloréns.
- Whalen, Carmen Teresa (2005). "Colonialism, Citizenship, and the Making of the Puerto Rican Diaspora: An Introduction". In Whalen, Carmen Teresa; Vázquez-Hernández, Víctor (eds.). The Puerto Rican Diaspora: Historical Perspectives. Philadelphia: Temple University Press. pp. 1–42. ISBN 1-59213-412-2.
