= Anarchism in Puerto Rico =

Anarchism as a social movement is one of the manifestations of the political left within the working classes of Puerto Rico, having its peak during the late 19th and early 20th century. Anarchism was predominantly present within, but not exclusive to, the working classes that emerged as the sociopolitical environment changed. The municipalities of Caguas and Bayamón were the epicenters of the movement. It was also recorded in other industrial centers, such as Ponce, San Juan, Arecibo, Cayey, Cidra, Juncos, Vega Baja, Utuado, Lares, Yauco and Mayagüez. Despite sharing some core values, Puerto Rican anarchism was heterogeneous in nature. In general, Puerto Rican anarchism was distinctly anti-organized religion, in particular against the Catholic Church that had retained considerable influence since the beginning of Spanish colonialism. Following the Treaty of Paris, it also grew to oppose American sovereignty, as it perceived that the island was being forced into servitude with an Americanization initiative, leading to distinct antiauthoritarian stances against both foreign and local politicians, the wealthy higher classes and American labor unions. However, on principle (as an opposition to nationalism, which was viewed as a manner for the state to consolidate power) the anarchists opposed joining the independence movement.

During the early 20th century, anarchists were considered a small, but active, minority within the Puerto Rican left. The movement attracted women, particularly younger ones, who felt unsatisfied within what they considered a predominantly "patriarchal society". Initiatives were made to create schools for the uneducated fraction of the population. It also faced unique circumstances among the Latin American anarchist movements, operating under an American colonial administration (whereas all of the others operated in a post-colonial or neocolonial environment), by not conforming to particular ethnic groups and by lacking an influx of Spanish anarchists after 1898. They still opposed organizations that represented Spanish power, such as was the case in 1912, when they participated in an anti-Church campaign led by anti-clerical activist Belén de Sárraga. As part of their internationalist ideals, Puerto Rican anarchists would denounce the working conditions in places abroad, such as Tampa. Ultimately, defection of leaders and government intervention mined Puerto Rican anarchism. Some like Iglesias Pantín did it early and formed an alliance with the AFL, eventually becoming a socialist senator in 1917.

The union's ties with the AFL distanced it from the anarchist roots of Spanish syndicates, from which the local working class had been linked. The former formally adopted a liberal ideology that mirrored their associate. However, with it also came an anti-anarchist sentiment that was predominant within the higher echelons of the AFL. Romero Rosa moved away from anarchism as he made his move to party politics, being elected in 1904. On March 9, 1911, Vilar in representation of the CES lead the tobacco worker's strike at Caguas. During the late stages of the event, two wealthy citizens were shot. The colonial authorities responded by intervening with a number of anarchists, leading to reports of torture. The suspect was eventually tried and found guilty of first degree murder. Vilar was not accused in this case, but the colonial authorities decided to charge him for violating the public morality codes, after he denounced a case of child abuse by a member of the clergy. In 1915, Vilar died while serving the year sentence for which he was convicted. The event led to a crisis in which several leaders either migrated or left for more moderate causes. Another fraction of the Puerto Rican anarchists would migrate to political organizations, such as the Partido Socislista. Figures like Romero Rosa would be lost, in his case becoming increasingly conservative and abandoning his previous political stance.

== History ==
=== Background and origins ===
The first strike related to working conditions that is recorded took place at San Juan, then the capital of the Spanish colonial government, in 1848. Following the 1868 Spanish Republic and the abolition of slavery five years later, the economic changes pushed farmers to the urban centers of Puerto Rico creating a new working class composed by salaried plantation workers and "artisans" (craftsmen). Following the 1873 decree of free association by Primo de Rivera, tobacco workshops created recreation centers for the employees where liberal ideas were shared in plays held at gatherings (later classified as "a vehicle for class self-affirmation") and which led to the propagation of stances against what was perceived as work exploitation. This was followed by the systematic incorporation of mutual aid initiatives for collective well-being (such Santiago Andrade's Sociedad Amigos del Bien Público) and casinos, such as the Círculo de Recreo y Beneficiencia. Camaraderie between the visitors to these groups allowed the systemic creation of a class identity, reflected in the emergence of cultural elements like Puerto Rican danza being born from it and initiatives to promote literacy (for which specific initiatives, like the Sociedad Protectora de la Inteligencia del Obrero, were created) and formal arts among its members. Later, the role of the lector (a literate speaker that was paid to read while the cigar rollers worked) was used to promote literacy and was also used in propagating leftist ideas, cooperativism and an open defiance to the authorities in order to preserve their autonomy.

During the 1880s, following the abolishment of slavery a shift was seen with an increasing working class migrating to novel coffee plantations that were supplanting the sugar plantations of Spanish slavers. By 1890, lectores were known at San Juan, which being the capital and a port city, had access to a number of foreign publications where these concepts were discussed in detail. The labor movement, however, remained an emergent entity until late in the decade, and the development of local anarchist mirrored this tendency. At least ten working class newspapers would be created between 1874 and 1897, beginning with El Artesano. Most were published by region, with four appearing in Ponce and three in San Juan. Soon the educated sectors of this class began initiatives to educate illiterate individuals in the factories, mainly those devoted to the manufacturing of tobacco, where a "lector" or reader would read the local news and political/literary material sampled from the recommendations of a commission (Marx, Malatesta, Kropotkin, Bakunin, etc.) and chosen by the workers. They would later discuss the content within themselves.

Groups that provided support in case of death or injury/illness were also organized. Cooperatives were first established during this timeframe. The sudden change in the landscape, however, created an over abundance of workers and not sufficient spaces to accommodate them. By the 1890s, strikes were being held to protest an increase in taxes. The appearance of anarchist newspaper Ensayo Obrero disturbed colonial governor Sabas Marín González enough to write a letter to king Alfonso XIII of Spain, lamenting the impending expansion of anarchism through Puerto Rico. The functionary requested the Crown to pass laws that prevented the printed publication of the ideas.

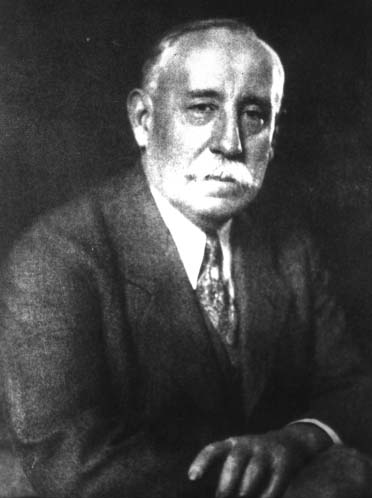
Santiago Iglesias Pantín

In 1896, Spanish-born anarchist Santiago Iglesias Pantín - who claimed to have been involved in the anarchist movements abroad and that he had been forced to leave the Spanish possession of Cuba due to his involvement in their independence efforts - made a scale in Puerto Rico in a transatlantic voyage towards England. Once there, he decided to stay at San Juan, where he found ideological affinity with some of the residents. Towards the end of the decade, the first known copy of Mikhail Bakunin's Federalism, Socialism, Anti-Theologism was first recorded in Puerto Rico, being translated and reprinted locally at Mayagüez. This and other books were distributed along propaganda made by local prints and directed to the working class. At the moment, individuals like Ramón Romero Rosa pushed these initiatives as an emancipative strategy. A literate segment of the class (led by figures such as José Ferrer y Ferrer) became increasingly radicalized and adopted the ideas of authors like Bakunin as they became freely available, leading the way for what would become the first groups identified with libertarian socialism.

In 1897, José Ferre y Ferrer, Eusebio Félix, Fernando Gómez Acosta, Ramón Romero Rosa and Eduardo Conde joined Iglesias in founding a CES called El Porvenir de Borinquen in San Juan, which would publish Ensayo Obrero, where they published from a variety of socialists stances including anarchism. Their bi-weekly reunions centered around these topics, backed by a growing library of anarchist and socialist literature. In 1898, Ensayo Obrero introduced female activist Dominica González. By 1900, there were more than 30 CESs throughout Puerto Rico, with San Juan, Ponce, Cayey, Yauco and Mayagüez hosting more than one. These early anarchists believed that workers were intentionally being withheld an education and that patrons were limiting their free time and income towards this end in order to keep them disorganized. A strike led to the suspension of the lector, but additional pressure allowed the practice to continue.

As CES distribution of publications and propaganda expanded, Esteban Rivera and Gabino Moczo made arrangements for a new institution where the materials were readily available and El Ensayo Obrero could be edited. After protests were held the day that Luis Muñoz Rivera swore in as prime minister of the new autonomic arrangement between Puerto Rico and Spain (February 11, 1898), the government and working class organizations were at odds. The Spanish authorities intervened with Ensayo Obrero, concerned with calls for a labor federation and international collaboration emerged from it. On March 25, 1898, a "proletariat meeting" was formally held led by Eduardo Conde, Ramón Romero Rosa, José Mauleón, José Ferrer y Ferrer, Juan Cepeda, Emiliano Ramos and Santiago Iglesias Pantín. Ensayo Obrero was fined, while Iglesias Pantín was held and later arrested. Copies of Ensayo Obrero were expected to be sent to them for authorization, which the publishers often avoided resulting in fines and imprisonment for Ferrer and Iglesias.

Ensayo Obrero remained neutral on the status of Puerto Rico, as Puerto Rico entered a new autonomy with Spain, the local anarchists took allied with the Autonomist movement in an attempt to reduce the foreign influence and sided with the eventual loser, José Celso Barbosa, since he proposed severing ties to the Spanish Liberal Party limiting the European presence more. The unexpected moderation of this editorial line was met with criticism from the more radical workers, who negatively called it a "conservative turn", while the editors began denying being labelled as anarchists in what they called a stereotypical and destructive sense. Regardless of this, the government withheld the publishing of Ensayo Obrero and jailed figures from the labor movement including Emiliano Ramos and Iglesias.

=== Anarchists vs. American government ===
Following the Spanish–American War, autonomy was abolished in favor of a fully colonial administration. The situation worsened for the working class due to a rapid shift in the economic hierarchy, the devaluation of the Puerto Rican peso (later Puerto Rican dollar) and new cabotage taxes implemented by the American colonial government. The American Tobacco Company extended its presence in Puerto Rico, becoming the dominant organization within the local industry. The lack of local unions meant allowed it to supplant the traditionally independent artisan practice of cigar rolling with a systematic capitalist format which led to small cigar shops disappearing and experienced rollers being incorporated to the work force of these corporations and being given a limited role in a process that became increasingly focused on specific tasks. Local rollers, which had been historically self-reliant and had opposed oversight authority and forced structure, began adopting stances sympathetic to anarchism which were combined with the ideas imported from abroad.

After being released by the new government Iglesias, who had been pro-American since his teen years, distanced more from the Puerto Rican independence movement. In turn, John Brooke blocked extradition requests from Spain. On October 20, 1898, the Federación Regional de Trabajadores was formally organized under Sandalio Sánchez. The former members of Ensayo Obrero would then fund the Federación Regional de Trabajadores, in which anarchists such as Ramos gained leadership roles, which published El Porvenir Social. Like its predecessor, the organization failed to establish an ideological consensus and instead tried to establish links with labor movements of the United States and criticizing the Republican and Federal parties that had survived from the Spanish era and remained autonomist. These efforts lead to the recognition of their publication in the anarchist New York-based El Despertar. Led by Iglesias, the FRT was sympathetic to the Americanization process began by the United States, believing that the working environment there could be beneficial to the local labor movement, and began adopting American socialist initiatives.

Following strikes within the tobacco industry of San Juan, the entity extended to Ponce, Carolina, Aguadilla and Fajardo including the typographic and dock workers (Muelle de Espigón). Eventually further actions lead to a salary increase of 20-25%. Iglesias established an increasingly pro-annexionism stance with the FRT, which contrasted with their 1898 postures. El Porvenir Social would remain pro-Americanization, socialism and anarchism, publishing content from anarchist authors from abroad but exhibiting American symbolism. Meanwhile, Iglesias formed an alliance with Daniel de León from the Socialist Labor Party, which sealed to establish a branch in Puerto Rico. The organization also introduced the celebration of May 1 to Puerto Rico, and in its first celebration workers carried the red flag. Leaders including Santiago Iglesias Pantín and Ramón Romero Rosa held reunions with military governor Guy Vernor Henry and San Juan mayor Luis Sánchez Morales, in which they demanded eight-hour shifts among other benefits for the working class. Afterwards, a meeting was held outside the building where El Porvenir Social was published.

Another was held at Mayagüez, in which Eugenio María de Hostos addressed the crowd. The pressure of these acts and similar events in at least seven more municipalities led to the passing of a compliant law on May 2, which proved ineffective in its application by the military government. As the group continued their criticism of local parties and promoted their support for annexation, the FRT began developing an internal schism as more of its members became sympathetic to the independence movement and nationalism in particular, citing the principles of "individual freedom" and "respect towards the motherland". This was complicated by some members siding with the Republican Party. This led to Iglesias, Romero and Conde's group to leave the FRT and create the Federación Libre de Trabajadores (FLT) on June 18, 1899. While adopting an offensive against the wealthy, the FLT was also critical of Puerto Rican nationalism, leading to arguments about Iglesias' status as a foreigner. Anarchists within the organization also faced threats of deportation.

The FLT held two congresses on May 1, 1900, now composed by 30 workers unions and critical of the Foraker Act, they discussed the international scene, eight-hour shifts, propaganda and education among other topics. In 1900, the imposition of a foreign governor without democratic vote led to a series of events that concluded with a series of strikes, in which the authorities intervened against the FLT. Having been accused of being an anarchist and anti-American, Iglesias left Puerto Rico and began a drastic ideological shift within the FLT, which lead to ending its association with the SLP, and approaching the American Federation of Labor. Despite this, the FLT members that were left behind continued with their anarchist and pan-socialist stances, including Romero's La Miseria: Periódico defensor de la clase obrera, which openly made calls to keep worker associations libertarian and questioned the sponsored migration of Puerto Ricans to work in plantations in Hawaii and carnivals. Unsatisfaction with being represented by a Spaniard in the United States was present within some members of the FLT, while others questioned the agenda of the United States in Puerto Rico and denounced Americanization attempts, including Ferrer who lashed at the "American Colossus". Other members of the FLT such as Jesús M. Balsac and Santiago Valle, began arguing for the use of the vote as a political tool to bring forth socialism by creating parties of their own. Several anarchists were skeptical of becoming involved in party-politics, considering them as nothing more than platforms for empty promises. Ideological mob violence began manifesting against anarchists and Severo Cirino was assaulted while working at the FLT headquarters. Strategic moves also abound and Venacio Cruz and Alfonso Torres began organizing a union at Caguas. May Day 1901 marked the final activities where anarchist stances were institutionally promoted by the FLT.

Iglesias then began to move the FLT away from its previous stances by publishing a piece attacking anarchism as violent and archaic in the New York Journal and formally adopted trade unionism and officializing an association with the AFL, which actively opposed anarchists, within days as the materialization of his pro-Americanization stances. This piece was reprinted by La Miseria. Shortly afterwards, Iglesias reaffirmed his new posture and adoption of trade unionism by beginning arrangements to have the FLT an affiliate of the AFL, gaining influence by being named the AFL organizer for the Caribbean by Gompers and holding a meeting with Theodore Roosevelt. This led to conflict between both camps, centering around disagreements on these issues and the opinions about the United States colonial authority.

Anarchists grew suspicious of Iglesias' motives, in part because he was being paid by the AFL and because his union leadership would work directly with the colonial governors, as a consequence they questioned his fidelity to the Puerto Rican work class and the wisdom of working with the state. Despite this anarchists would continue to use the FLT as a front to push their ideals, and Ferrer y Ferrer collaborated with Pablo Vega Santos to establish a subsidiary at Caguas. Others, like Cruz, would retain some presence in meetings. Iglesias would make his return to Puerto Rico by November 1901.

The FLT experienced issues recruiting and began losing membership during the following years, only preserving a steady presence of carpenters and tobacco workers, which also complicates their coordination funding efforts. Both of these groups had retained their anarchist tendencies more than other offices, which clashed directly with the Iglesias leadership. Paca Escabí would represent anarchists in the 1902 meeting. During the spring of 1902, both Romero Rosa and Fernando Gómez were attacked. Following a confrontation between Federals and Republicans, the FLT protested and in turn had several of its members arrested, including Romero Rosa and Corino. Gómez Acosta was also fired upon during an event, escaping harm. Anarchists were in turn accused of detonating a pipe bomb that resulted in a death at Humacao.

This subordination lead to a move from anarchism to partisan socialism, it combined with unsatisfaction with actions of the colonial administration and resulted in members of the FLT seeking to remove anarchists from the organization. While admitting that not all of them where necessarily revolutionary socialists any longer, the leadership argued against expelling them. Anarchists would remain within the FLT, but published critical material promoting their own postures (in particular attacks on the Catholic Church and local politics) and reprinted foreign authors, with El Porvenir Social agglutination both the FRT and the FLT and holding association with anarchist groups throughout Ibero America (including Ciencia Social, La Revista Blanca, El Nuevo Ideal) despite also serving as the SLP's official paper. Content with anarcho-naturalist and anarcho-communist leanings was also published.

The organization's base, however, drifted away from the formal standings of the organization and allowed enough room for anarchists to thrive in their methods to use it as a tool to promote their ideology among the workers. The arts –plays, poetry, chorus and concerts – were used to push the far left's concepts. Centers of study would serve to create a class of "organic intellectuals" that would then become involved in educating the illiterate, writing books/propaganda and hosting tribunes and discussions. Independent unions would emerge, but none grew powerful enough to be able to rival the FLT, instead infiltrating the ranks and creating splinter groups within it.

On May 1, 1901, Palmiro de Lidia's Fin de Fiesta (under the guise of "socialist drama".) was highlighted in the festivities. Local anarchist plays would emerge, including Enrique Plaza's El Anarquista, Ramón Romero Rosa's La Emancipación del Obrero, Rebeldías, Luisa Capetillo's En el campo, amor libre and Como se prostituyen los pobres, José Limón de Arce's Redención, A. Millán's El poder del Obrero (a.k.a. La mejor venganza) and J.M. Santiago's Los crímenes sociales y Peluchín el limpiabotas (a.k.a. La obra del sistema capitalista).

Impromptu tribunes were organized in public plazas, but they frequently concluded in confrontations with the police. Anarchism grew increasingly popular among tobacco workers, but was also present among carpenters, barbers, binders, builders and shoemakers among other lines of work. The former were responsible for most strikes against the Trusts, and of distributing literature. They believed that strikes were the route to bring anarcho-communism by recovering the rights that they thought were appropriated by their patrons. These were still a minority and fell in conflict with other factions, in particular the workers affiliated with the Tobacco Workers International Union, who among other things accused them of being double agents tasked with destroying the unions from within.

Shortly afterwards, the FLT was openly pushing candidates. Anarchists, however, were skeptical that the winners of the event would favor anything besides capitalism and began a campaign against political events. This stance lead to a direct confrontation between the movement and the United States authority in Puerto Rico, which they felt had allowed for an increased control by American corporative interests and the AFL. The FLT leadership supported an alliance between their Partido Obrero Socialist.

In places like Caguas, the FLT subsidiaries were dominated by the distinctly anarchist nucleus such as Ferrer y Ferrer and Pablo Vega Santos. Juan Vilar's Solidaridad would become the first recorded anarchist group to operate independently. In 1903, Venacio Cruz published Fragmentos, where despite heavily reaffirming his anarchist postures in the poem "Época Insana", he also offered respect to Ferrer y Ferrer and to Iglesias despite ideological differences. Escabí once again represented the ideal at 1904 FTL meetings. She repeated this the following year, being joined by Marcela Torres de Cirino, in an effort to discourage the organization's involve with politics, a call that wasn't heard by the leadership. Meanwhile, Luisa Capetillo began writing at Arecibo and later she would take the role of lector.

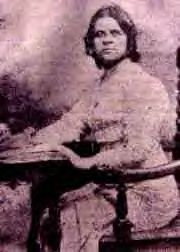
Luisa Capetillo.

By 1904, the FLT was actively working with Partido Union and Romero Rosa – having published the pro-suffrage, anti-authority, anti-capitalist and anti-colonialism work La cuestión y Puerto Rico – won a seat as a delegate on the argument that workers could use their numbers to change these things. He would champion the eight-hour shift, and was in turn pressured to promote other initiatives such as the minimum working age for typographers. Rosa published Catecismo Socialista in 1905 in which he once again argued from an anti-state posture and concluding that only libertarian socialism or its counterpart, parliamentarian socialism, could solve Puerto Rico's issues. However, Rosa's political work angered some anarchists within the FLT, who used the Unión Obrera newspaper as a venue to vent these frustrations and label him a "sold out" and once again urged against becoming involved with political parties.

In 1905, Balsac pressed for a variant of anarchism that he called "free socialism" in his Apuntes históricos (de Mayagüez). This year was marked with strikes and the press, most notably La Democracia, began describing the strikers as uneducated being led astray by anarchists. Vega Santos retorted that they had become biased in favor of capitalism and the state, before criticizing that the government that considered itself democratic "threw strikers in jail". While Winthrop was increasingly concerned with the anarchist presence in the FLT, the strikes led to a 10-hour shift and a wage increase. This author also held the government-sanctioned carnivals in contempt and expressed being deeply disappointed that the working class would participate in them, a similar concern was shared by Fernando de Mantilla. José G. Osorio thought the same of taverns, distancing the Puerto Rican movement from the popular "beer halls" of their European counterparts. Publishing a book titled ¡Solidaridad!, fellow anarchist Alfonso Torres labeled Americans as equal to the previous Spanish regime and dismissed the elections as a way to legitimize the representation of individuals that did not understand the conditions of the working class. Despite this, he felt that the FTL-AFL was the best way to push forward the union's social/economic agenda and eventual anarcho-communism, serving as a tool for their own goals. In letters published by anarchists during this year, they consistently labeled the United States as hypocritical for "claiming to be democratic" but utilizing the police to suppress strikes, one in particular comparing the modus operandi to Russia. Escabí would echo Torres' comparison, but argued that the situation had actually worsened for the working class since the American invasion. Both authors would label the administration as mediocre and lashed against governor Beekman Winthrop, both of which were seen as an "imperialist" imposition.

In 1906, the Caguas-Cayey Tobacco Company declared a strike, which was fueled by the anarchist media and soon extended to the Turina and Quiñones factories. The outcome of the protests was considered by the workers as a victory, which they touted in their newspapers, despite several being fired in the process. Confrontations continued, with Republicans emerging on behalf of the state, while arrests were ordered in response to publications. Puerto Rican anarchists actively monitored the international scene and reported on events such as Francisco Ferrer y Guardia's arrest on June 4, 1906. By this point his ideas had been actively adopted in the local community, being promoted by individuals such as Juan Vilar. In the anarchist center of Bayamón, a street was named after Ferrer y Guardia.

By 1906, an increasingly conflicted Rosa published an essay apologetic of anarchism (calling it "an ideal that is extremely honorable and good") titled "El poder de la amistad" as part of Entre broma y vera, where he also complimented Kropotkin. Later that year he tried running for the Partido Unión, which led to being expelled from the FLT, dying a year later. By publishing Hacia el porvenir Venacio Cruz made another anti-suffrage, anti-patriotism and anti-state plight, in the process attacking Romero Rosa. Between 1906 and 1907, anarchists tried to sabotage the impending arrival of the Cigar Makers International Union, which began receiving formal recognition on January of the latter year, believing that it could lead to an American monopoly. Writers including Venacio Cruz criticized the entity for charging a fee that was considered unacceptably high, and argued that workers would become indifferent towards unionism. The CMIU responded that such a stance compromised the entirety of unionism and accused him specifically of being a double-agent. Parallel to this, Pedro San Miguel, Pablo Vega Santos and Juan Vilar worked on the organization of the Great Assembly of Puerto Rican Tobacco Workers. Others wrote abroad lamenting a lack of eagerness for resistance.

In 1908, an atheist library at Ponce distributed the work of Kropotkin among other leftists, despite not being strictly anarchist. As their agenda against American-style unionism and elections increased, anarchists would continue to chastise any worker that entered political contention and the FLT itself. Through Voz Humana the Caguas anarchists openly mocked any idea that the November elections would change anything. A generalized idea that workers were being duped into choosing between two dummy parties – Partido Union and Republican – in a divide and conquer strategy became prevalent within the group, who noted that ultimately the only real power lies in Washington. As the elections approached, Torres' La farsa electoral en Puerto Rico and Político, jamás were published. However, when the FLT ignored their plight and made a move to become a separate party. In October, Negrín abandoned the union and formed his own, leading to a fight with the foreman of the Porto Rico American Tobacco Company in which he was non-fatally shot. At the elections, the workers running for the established parties fared well, but the FLT's experiment finished with 1% support. Torres criticized through the Eco del Torcedor. In December 1908, the editors of this publication would be fined following a trial for libel, due to their stances and they decided to relocate to Bayamón before ceasing press.

Resuming their conflict with Iglesias the following year, anarchists wrote abroad to call him a hypocrite and a sellout. Despite this, others also became involved with the FTL-sanctioned Cruzada del Ideal, a campaign to promote leftist ideals throughout Puerto Rico by using cultural and artistic displays. Among those involved was Torres. In 1909, San Miguel and Dieppa created a spiritual successor to El Eco del Torcedor, the tobacco workers' Nuevo Horizonte. Having already reached the adult population, Vilar began the first leftist school in Puerto Rico, distancing it from both public and Christian education. He was particularly critical of the children's religious beliefs and the recreation that they were exposed to at gaming parlors, publicly writing about it. Educational initiatives for both adults and children were focused at Bayamón, Caguas and San Juan and their CESs. The execution of Ferrer y Guardia also inspired the anarchists like Vega Santos and Enrique Gómez to lash against public and Christian education, reflecting their intention to follow in the steps of his Modern School system. The establishment of the Centro Racionalista Juventud Estudiosa emerged as a consequence. (nombre completo) As the number of women workers grew, especially in the tobacco industry, the writings of Capetillo began to have an effect and by 1910 she had published a newspaper named La Mujer. That same year, anarchists led by Negrín began a fundraiser for strikers at Tampa by themselves, following indifference from other working class groups. It was not until a Floridian letter complaining that the only help came from Bayamón was published at Ensayo Obrero that others would join. Most of San Juan's Nuevas Ideas group were anarchists led by Severo Cirino and Alfonso Torrs, the latter of whom credited Vilar with inspiring the idea.

Within a decade, the FLT membership had increased to 54 unions. During these years, the celebration of May 1 would retain far left influences. After the AFL adopted Labor Day, the FLT followed. Despite it being considered an "official celebration devoid of a revolutionary past", anarchist plays such as Pietro Gori's Primero de Mayo and Palmiro de Lidia's Fin de fiesta would be exhibited during them. When the Dr. Ruiz Soler Sanatorium was being constructed, the tobacco workers paid for a building for tuberculosis patients. They organized a number of funds that were redirected to other initiatives, such as students abroad. Their practice of donating money to fuel strikes elsewhere led to the creation of a blacklist to keep certain workers out of the factories. Within the first decade of American sovereignty, the workforce in cigar rolling increased nearly 200% as the ATC reached nearly 80% of the market. This facilitated the propagation of anarchist ideas among some workers, which came to resent American intervention in Puerto Rico. This early form of libertarian socialism coexisted with other socialist tendencies among the working class. In 1910, ¡Solidaridad! became Trece de Octubre to honor Francisco Ferrer y Guardia and a meeting was held to commemorate his death where plays and artistic manifestations were organized. This was short lived, and within a year they were named Juventud Estudiosa.

That same year, another activist advocated withdrawing the FLT from any electoral event, Antonio Quiñones Ríos, and delegates supported the move ending their political incursion and providing a moral victory for anarchists. The Labor Day activities held at Caguas were hosted by Vilar and according to Vega Santos, were the largest working class gathering seen at the city up to that point. Despite this, a shortage of tobacco leaf and Vilar's health as he developed sharp stomach pains and blurred vision threatened the CES that year, forcing it to focus on innovative approaches including a band, a short-lived attempt to publish a paper and more plays. A conglomerate of groups joined to hold a meeting on the anniversary of Ferrer y Guardia's death, in which they advocated for the adoption of his education model. As Vilar worsened he received some aid, but soon afterwards this stopped coming and his wife also fell ill, infuriating the leader who wrote seven letters critical of the state of the working class and why he felt that they abandoned the CES during his illness. Responses to this were mixed, Enrique Gómez of the FLT accused him of misappropriating union funds, but colleagues in Bayamón helped pay the treatment when he exhibited psychiatric symptoms. In 1911, Jímenez, Barrios and Negrín supported the strikes by publishing a specialized paper, ¡La Huelga! Órgano Defensor del Movimiento. After leaving to New York in 1912, Capetillo continued writing to anarchist papers on the topic of anarcho-feminism. Parallel to this, Francisca Barrios wrote in the local and foreign anarchist press.

=== The Ventura Grillo crisis ===
The publications linked to Ferrer y Ferrer were clear in their anti-government stance, believing that any form of government was oppressive in nature, while also bearing characteristics of positivism in their belief that once the control was removed, everything would fall into place. Protests were promoted as the ultimate tool towards this goal, in particular general strikes, while bloodshed was discouraged. However, others like Capetillo had grown to accept retaliatory violence as unavoidable and justifiable, citing the deaths of Ferrer y Guardia and Shūsui Kōtoku as well as the Haymarket affair as examples were the confrontations with the government led to murders that were sanctioned as legal. In general she justified that only a minority of anarchists attacked first, while criticizing the Church and those involved in the 1898 French Revolution of perverting their ideals by using them as justification for killing.

In March 1911 a black tobacco worker and anarchist named Ventura Grillo was involved in a strike and amidst the tensions assaulted the trio of Ángel Núñez, José María Berríos and Rafael Ceferinos. Attempts to have him interned in a facility for the mentally ill failed. However, the newspaper La Correspondencia publicly labeled him as insane. On March 9, 1911, Grillo decided to retaliate by firing a gun against Adrián Pérez of E. Moreno and Co. in Caguas, also murdering an innocent bystander named Pedro José Díaz who tried to help. In later writings, Santiago Iglesias tried to link the incident to an association between the target and the West Indies Corporation. Two days later Justo Andrade, a sympathizer of the state, responded by murdering striker Alfonso Reyes. In response, Centro 11 de Marzo -an anarcho-communist reunion center and library at Bayamón- was created by a group led by Negrín, Ramón Barrios and Epifanio Fiz Jiménez.

Grillo would confess that he was an anarchist and that others conspired with him, but defend himself by claiming that Pérez had declined the strikers demands the previous day. These events created a crisis for Puerto Rican anarchism, since the police responded by multiplying their presence at Bayamón and Caguas, while the reading of far-left literature was prohibited. Juan Vilar was arrested. The secret police under the orders of San Telmo breached the Centro 11 de Marzo and confiscated all literature and propaganda. Having offered strategic support to strikes among the tobacco workers, the intervention forced its closure. Juventud Estudiosa suffered the same fate. The processing of 33 arrested workers was overseen by prosecutor Acosta Quintero. As more buildings were breached in search of associates that had been declared fugitives such as Enrique Plaza, military governor Colton joined Telmo in entering Vilar's Centro de Estudios Sociales. Propaganda, literature and newspapers were confiscated. A joint effort by tobacco workers, the FLT, Federación Espiritista and others provided food and legal defense to the arrested. Meeting with the military governor also took place.

Acosta would label the suspects as an "anarchist cell" and the dismantled CES would be described as an "anarchist club". The prosecution argued that the CES had tried to manufacture dynamite sticks, but most were released. Vilar was briefly released, only to be arrested again. He would remain in custody along Grillo, even as the others were released, after the police failed to gather information of an "anarchist conspiracy". While the Tribunal Supremo granted him a release on habeas Corpus violation the state appealed and he remained in prison. At Caguas, Acosta charged him with "crime against honesty" for publishing an article linking a pedophile to the Church (republishing articles from the La Voz del Cantero newspaper). Vilar was found guilty, sentenced to remain in jail for eighteen months and fined on April 26, 1911.

Grillo's trial began the following month and the defense cited "temporary insanity", exploiting the press portrayals which failed to convince a jury that convicted him on first degree murder charges. Colton would receive complaints of several of the arrested, who claimed irregularities with the process, illegal domicile searches, illegal interrogation, inhibition of legal aid, libel, assault and false imprisonment. While the colonial governor and general attorney Foster V. Brown conceded that Acosta had overstepped, they were apologetic about the situation and justified his actions. In June 1911, the appeal in Vilar's case was seen by the Tribunal Supremo, which ratified its previous stance that an habeas corpus violation had taken place. Anarchists would shift the focus of their activities to Bayamón.

Afterwards, Colton himself would speak ill of the Juventud Estudiosa CES and blamed it for Grillo's actions, all the while claiming that he would "not tolerate breaking the law or backstabbing plots from anarchists", emphasizing that "anarchy and anarchist societies have no room in this territory". The Grillo case would have a significant impact on the anarchists' propaganda, with the lector being controlled to prevent its propagation. However, anarchists and other radicals would continue their activism, attacking the corporations by using the legal system. When Andrades went on trial for the murder of Reyes, a group led by Negrín served as witnesses, and the jury found the defendant guilty on November 3, 1911. That same month, however, St. Elmo placed Tómas Vega, Francisco Pagán and Luis Aguilar on trial at Bayamón for pushing anarchist ideals in public, for which they were all fined. Vega Santos warned about an impending strike on the CES. The detective would focus on 11 de Marzo and Colton authorized the police to breach the building, which led to its permanent closure. Vilar tried appealing his charges on "honesty", a case which eventually found its way to the Tribunal Supremo with the collaboration of the FLT, which in November upheld the conviction of the Caguas court but reduced it by six months. His health worsened rapidly and Espiritistas including Juan Obrer and the editor of Iris de Paz magazine Ramón Negrón Flores began fund raising to help him. Vilar was released in 1912 and published Páginas libres, but his health issues prevented any significant contribution afterwards and he died on May 1, 1915.

=== Work in exile and distantiation of leaders ===
The upper echelons of the FLT did not use the events at Caguas to give exposure to the involved as symbols or "martyrs" for the cause, while the government stopped discussing them in their media, as a consequence of this anarchism would experience a sharp decline in support. Concurrent to this, the FLT's arguments for pushing trade unionism through political parties became more popular and anarchists lost more ground within the workers. The tobacco trust also decided to use the events as justification to ban those involved in the strike, crippling the movement by precipitating the migration of its leaders to diverse locations, including New York, Habana and Tampa. The anarchist migrators joined other leftists like Bernardo Vega.

Joining those that left because of lack of work were the ones that intended to avoid the government, in total being the majority of the prominent anarchists. Despite their exile, they continued in communication with Puerto Rican colleagues and informed of their status. In example, after a strike erupted within the local sugar industry, an assembly to support the workers was organized by the exiles at Lexington Avenue, in which figure such as Ángel María Dieppa, Rafael Correa, Herminio Colón, Ventura Mijón and Antonio Vega make appearances. They also mingled with foreign anarchist-friendly groups such as Industrial Workers of the World. At least a dozen, including figures like Dieppa and Plaza, would be active in participating in strikes held abroad.

FLT-backed strikes still raged, between 1913 and 1914 tobacco workers protested, in 1915 agricultural workers destroyed plantations and the police responded by targeting them. As demands to congress for legislation that protected them fell short and the working conditions and wages worsened as foreign corporations took over the local industries, the union began looking at the possibility of going back to politics. In March 1915, the Partido Socialista was born and Iglesias Pantín was named the president of this independent branch. Parallel to this, Severo Cirino denounced the measures that the government of Cuba was taking in the adjacent island. The PS distanced itself from anarchism, but their ideals still found their way into it. Affiliates Juan S. Marcano, Enrique Plaza and José Elías Levis Bernard employed anarchist symbology in their books.

Actual anarchists, however, were divided with a group led Pablo Vega Santos distancing themselves from the posture, while others continued their campaign against party politics. Those that remained, in particular Dieppa, lashed against the new PS affiliates. Vega Santos responded by calling him a traitor and accused him of being a double agent for the wealthy. Dieppa countered by recalling that this was not the first time that Vega Santos had participated in political parties and that he was paid well for it. Despite this, in El porvenir social he would argue that even a "Republican socialist regime" would be better than the current state, but not as ideal as anarcho-syndicalism.

In 1914, Capetillo joined the organized workers in Cuba, the following year becoming involved in a strike and endorsing a manifest created by the Federación Anarchists de Cuba. In response to this, president Manuel García Menocal ordered her deportation. Despite this, Capetillo would remain in contact with Anarchists such as Jaime Vidal, who collaborated with her in Mi opinión. When prominent anarchists like Jean Grave, Malato, Reclus and Kropotkin publicly supported the Allies during World War I, Puerto Rican anarchist Juan José López rebutted the posture as "brainless", citing that it was disingenuous to believe that several of its members really opposed militarism or that a triumph would usher in an era of prosperity or democracy. He argued that in the end, all that it would bring was more homeless and more maimed individuals. Likewise, Dieppa lashed out against soldiers, calling them "the lowest slaves" and "[worse than] a eunuch" urging them to abandon enforcing the state and join the workers. This proved a departure from the influential postures of international anarchism in response to their own values.

Upon returning from their exile, Capetillo and Dieppa, employing their connections in an attempt to aid a struggling anarchist movement. Now lacking a local press, they employed Cultura Obrera from New York to publish their propaganda, in exchange funding that paper. After the police interrupted a reunion at the Bayamón FLT in February 1916, both sides clashed, leaving Negrín wounded. At New York, Dieppa, Herminio Colón and Mijón supported the strikes happening within the sugar industry. During this time, Alfonso Torres, Alicea and Rafael Acosta collaborated with Vega.

The legal imposition of the United States citizenship and later the military draft on Puerto Ricans marked 1917. Iglesias had used the FLT and PS to push for the first, while anarchists didn't take a posture on the issue. Consequently, they didn't publicly react to the Jones Act. Resident commissioner Luis Muñoz Rivera and other politicians lobbied in favor of extending selective service to Puerto Rico and Enoch Crowder granted it. Institutionally, the FLT supported it and as president of the PS, Iglesias Pantín did as well. Anarchists, nationalists and independentists opposed the draft and campaigned against it. José M. Alicea was arrested during a month for refusing to register. After local legislation limiting speech and federal sedition laws were passed during World War I, Dieppa publicly attacked the authorities and was arrested, tough the case would later be decided in his favor. Pedro Calleja was detained while returning to Puerto Rico due to possessing Industrial Workers of the World (IWW), membership. As strikes continued to wage during the war, colonial governor Arthur Yager declared martial law and prohibited public demonstrations and leftist propaganda. As a result of disobeying and participating in a strikers meeting, Capetillo was arrested. Her treatment was protested by fellow anarchist Ramón Barrios and sympathizer Epifanio Fiz Jiménez.

During World War I, Bayamón anarchists continued their activism. At the 1917 general elections, the PS recorded 14% of the vote, electing six members in the municipalities. With Iglesias also winning a seat in the Senate of Puerto Rico, this boosted his argument that this was the way to weaken capitalism.

In 1918, the Grupo Souvarine and a CES was created. PS leader Rojas displayed signs of adopting several anarchist ideas, becoming interested in the Bolshevik Revolution, distancing himself from Iglesias and others within the FLT leadership. In January, the Bayamón and Puerta de Tierra groups were collaborating in a strike within the tobacco industry. Negrín and Barrios travelled to Cuba to coordinate with the groups there. Later, when the DOJ was investigating Florida-based José Martínez Gil, agent Byrd Douglas claimed that he collaborated with the duo. In November 1919, the Juan M. Alicea, Antonio Palau and Emiliano Ramos established El Grupo Soviet de Bayamón. The hybridization of socialist and anarchist discourse continued, and by 1919 Marcano was labeling a number of international anarchists as "martyrs" a posture that he had also expressed in regards to Vilar, who was regarded as a "noble apostle".

An agreement between the tobacco workers and the Trust was reached in 1917. However, two years later a joint effort in Puerto Rico, Cuba and Tampa responded with strikes after claiming that the accord was not being honored. Anarchist Alfredo Negrín was sent to Havana along another delegate to work on propaganda and fuel the strike sentiment. However, they were arrested as soon as they reached port and following the intervention of the Socialist Party and the International Tobacco Union on their behalf, deported from Cuba. A meeting was held to denounce the situation. On February 23, 1919, the federal government breached the headquarters of El Corsario at Lexington Avenue on charges of intending to bomb Wilson and arrested, among others, Puerto Rican Rafael Acosta.

In 1919, Ángel María Dieppa published his take on the ideals of anarchism in El porvenir de la sociedad humana. In 1919, while continuing their activism at New York, Mijón and Acosta collaborated with the newspaper El Corsario. Dieppa and Acosta did their part by supporting strikes in the city. Juan Alicea and his brother, José, created a network that distributed El Comunista between Puerto Rico and New York and to create ties between locals and foreign activists. Among its strategic moves beyond the boundaries of Puerto Rico, El Comunista supported the American Communist Party and economically supported the Russian Revolution. The IWW, which had ties to Puerto Rico through Domason Núñez, tried to unsuccessfully establish a local branch. Local anarchists expressed sympathies for their methods and Alfonso Torres defended the modus operandi of the "Wobblies" as "quicker and more economical", for which he was insulted by union leaders.

In May Day 1920, the Bayamón faction created El Comunista, having adopted the term comunista to describe their anarcho-communist leanings, which was distributed internationally and expressed moral support for the IWW. The paper was supported by the income of its distribution at San Juan, Cayey, Ponce, Utuado, Salinas, Río Piedras, Caguas, Toa Alta, Manatí and Cataño besides Bayamón. The inauguration of the paper featured Sandalio Marcial attack the new education system, which anarchists believed promoted American militarism. This would be a talking point for other members, such as Antonio Álvarez and Manuel García, who criticized the formation of the Puerto Rico National Guard, which he expected to "repress" strikes. This went along a critic against president Woodrow Wilson for the US intervention in Central America and the Caribbean, which they considered "hypocritical", since the nation promoted itself as a defender of democracy.

This group demonstrated their independence from the larger unions anarchists by directly attacking the FLT/AFL/CMIU, as they reflected the extent of that their alliance with groups from abroad -such as Tampa, Havana, Key West and Pinar Del Río- by emphasizing their situation and fund raising for strikes. El Comunista allowed anarchists to directly attack the union leaders, in particular Iglesias Pantín and Vega Santos, and to attack the Union Party for its pro-independence stance. Venacio Cruz used this juncture to counterattack for the FLT leadership having labeled him a "strikebreaker" (for protesting the fees of the foreign unions in 1905 and later in 1911 and 1914 for distancing from the institutional postures) on several occasions. Juan Ocasión called the former anarchists "submissive". Iglesias used the union organs to fire back and called them "strikebreakers" on the issue of Florida, also lambasting the IWW and accusing Palau of using the FLT to "draft dodge". In response, El Comunista published a piece by William Dudley Haywood, which questioned the FLT leaders by recognized the union's affiliates. When Iglesias compared Samuel Gompers to several leftist authors and activists, El Comunista mocked the idea and called him a "hack".

The exchanges between Iglesias and El Comunista aggravated internal differences within the PS, which combined by the leader's support for Americanization gathered opposition from a group that included non-(and former) anarchists such as Plaza, Marcano and Rojas. At the 1919 convention, Iglesias was questioned about his changing stances on the war and military service. Palau had used this stance to argue that he had placed the union in the hands "of pro-war advocates" and to sell war bonds. The Independence of Puerto Rico was also discussed, with Torres cautiously arguing that it could be used to advance the worker's agenda. Rojas supported the stance, but Iglesias did not allow the status issue to be discussed. A then-liberal and independentist Luis Muñoz Marín approached El Comunista and despite speaking well of the work done by anarchists during decades also advocated that the colonial situation was preventing any radical ideas from flourishing and that they had to work within the electoral system while working in parallel to advance the conditions for a social "revolution" so that independence would not lead to the same elite taking over, only to be rebuffed by editor Ventura Mijón who argued that they wouldn't "abandon [their] principles" and disregarded the political status issue by claiming that making "common cause with the American Communist Party" and the Third International was a quicker way to achieve their goals. The issue of independence would be touched in a pro-Soviet article by Amelio Morazín, who argued in favor of self-determination. Three months prior to the colonial suffrage, Rojas took over the FLT's Unión Obrera and offered a sympathetic posture, in response El Comunista ceased their attack on Iglesias. At the 1920 general elections, the PS recorded 23.7% of the vote, winning eight municipalities.

The Red Scare was enacted in Puerto Rico as it was throughout the hemisphere. By September 18, 1920, El Comunista denounced that it had been denied second-class by the USPS, a common employment of the Espionage Act against far left propaganda during this period. In response, copies were distributed abroad using covert methods and carried by migrating activists.

In July 1920, three issues of El Comunista were seized during a raid against IWW members at Arizona. Along this, the newspaper received an increasing amount of money from abroad. In December 1920, the United States Federal Bureau of Investigation began an investigation on local leftist groups, including the local anarchists. When the relevant report was filed on January 31, 1921, Bayamón was its main focus, under the pseudonym of "Communist Party of Porto Rico". This was coupled with the systematic layoff of workers that along foreign investors had contributed to create a $100 surplus for the paper and in February 1921, El Comunista published its last issue. As it came under federal scrutiny, the Bayamón anarchist faction disappeared from the public. It was that same year, when the news of the Soviet suppression of Russian anarchists became widely known, that Caribbean anarchists distanced from them and their form of communism.

=== Clandestinity and modern anarchism ===
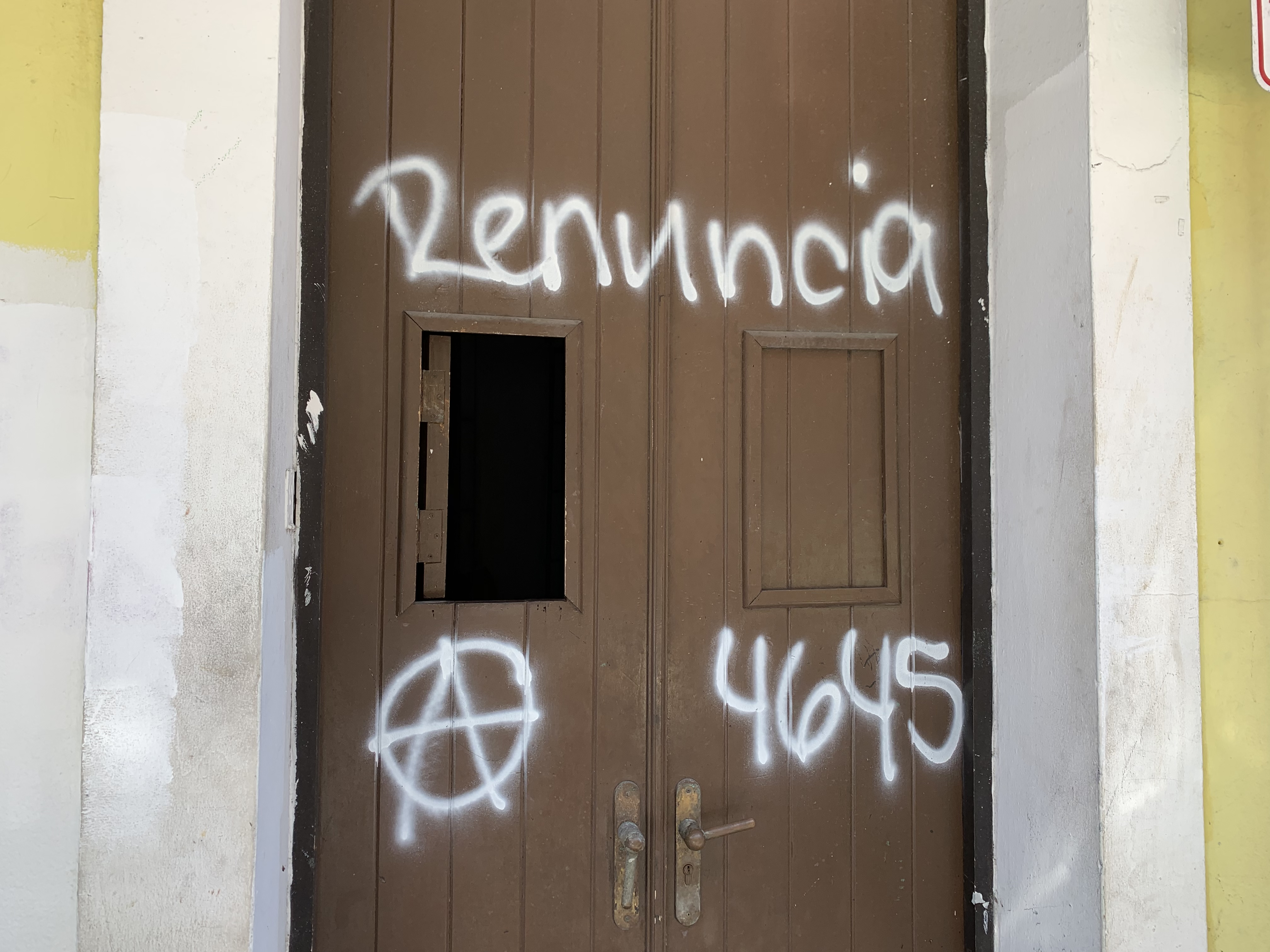
Even though no group publicly advocated in its favor during the unrest that lead to the resignation of Ricardo Rosselló in July 2019, the circle-A was ubiquitously found among other protest graffiti painted throughout Old San Juan.

Faced with more conflict with the government, anarchist activities in Puerto Rico were taken underground. Whereas they would rely on propaganda and newspaper during the movement's heyday, they would leave little to no paper trail behind after the events that unfolded during the 1920s. Capetillo died in 1922, an event that diminished the local anarchists due to her popularity. Alfonso Torres distanced himself from anarchism and went on to gain prominence within the PS. As their movement continued to lose momentum, others like Ramón Barrios, also joined the party. Activism now focused abroad, with Dieppa and Marcial leading similar publications at New York. Meanwhile, José M. Alicea became involved with the Ferrer School. Others, like Emiliano Ramos, continued to contribute to publications abroad.

Meanwhile, Dieppa continued to become involved with the Florida anarchists and as a writer, continued fostering his message. Emiliano Ramos continued his work as a writer for the IWW's Cultura Proletaria until 1931. In 1932, Ferrer y Ferrer published Los ideales del siglo XX, in which he distanced himself from his anarchist past and tried to push libertarianism as a superior alternative while also defending an annexationist posture. J.R. Pérez's contribution in 1933 marked the final correspondence between the Puerto Rican anarchists and the IWW. In 1934, Ventura Mijón participated in the formal foundation of the Puerto Rican Communist Party, with other vestiges of the movement being seen in the occasional public mention of anarchism, mostly emerging as a reaction to the Spanish Revolution of 1936. The rise of the Puerto Rican Nationalist Party monopolized the revolutionary ideas in Puerto Rico.

It was not until the 1960s that a silence of several decades ended, with the creation of the Taller Libertario Luisa Capetillo and their publication of their take on the namesake. Entering the following decade, and now with closer ties to the socialist ideals, the Unión de Socialistas Libertarios emerged from within the UPR and adopted a number of anarchist leanings such as publishing Bandera Negra on April 10, 1972, celebrating May Day and giving classes on the concept. During this time, the presence of anarchism was recorded within the students of the Universidad de Puerto Rico, but ultimately this resurgence vanished as other far left ideas were more popular. During this decade, "left libertarians" represented a percent within the Partido Independentista Puertorriqueño (PIP).

After the Luis Fortuño administration passed Public Law 7, which downsized the government and led to thousands of public workers being waved, anarchists made their presence known in a number of marches that followed. These individuals adopted a number of international icons, such as the black flag and the hymn La Internacional. Shortly before the 2010–11 UPR strikes, anarchist students would begin hosting lecture groups at the UPR, gathering a number of unaffiliated sympathizers together. In June 2009, Puerto Rico Libertario was created. The largest group to emerge was Acción Libertaria, which adopted a modified version of the flag of Puerto Rico among other symbology. La Acción Libertaria and Semillas Libertarias made use of the Internet – through blogs and websites – to disseminate information and propaganda. Besides the focus on anarchist education, these groups revived the use of plays. Acción Libertaria's stance is anti-state and anarcho-communist, while the second made emphasis on international libertarian collaboration.

Besides the events that lead to the UPR strikes, other areas were the state "intrudes" in civilian affairs -such as the relationship between development and the expropriation of lands- are of interest to these groups. Another cell organized a conference of the North American Anarchist Studies Network, attracting a crowd of at least 200. A group known as C.C.C. held a number of activities. However, it disbanded after a year, while Acción Libertaria also saw a reduction on its membership. Other, independent groups continued appearing during the mid-2010s. A different modality, anarcho-capitalism, started gaining public exposure in the wake of the destruction that hurricane Maria caused at Puerto Rico. This was a direct consequence of the arrival of a large group of cryptocurrency investors, who when interviewed noted that they intend to create a hub named "Puertopia", from which they hope to implement their libertarian models.

The Puerto Rican punk scene since the 1980s had anarchist ideals in form of bands, fanzines or collectives. Early boricua anarco-punk bands include Actitud Subversiva (1993)from Bayamón, Cojoba (1995) from Carolina or Distorción Rebelde (1995) from Guayama, that wrote lyrics inspired in anarchism. Also fanzines like Zinevergüenza or Factura No Pagada helped to spread the gospel of anarchy in punk circles across the Island. They were even collectives like the F.A.R. (Frente Anarquista Revolucionario) in the early 2000s in Bayamón, Puerto Rico. The latter ones were led by Omar 'Kilín' Quiles (later frontman in Un Final Fatal) and it was composed at one point by 20 to 30 punks and skinheads from the Bayamón inner cities, that lived by the anarco-punk way of life.

== Philosophy and political stances ==
=== Self-perception ===
Despite heavy European influence, Puerto Rican anarchists considered their own conditions different from other places. In the words of Luisa Capetillo, they perceived themselves as "fair, equitative, humanitarian, amicable, [...] loyal [and] brave", among other things and considered their role as that of protectors and martyrs of a "universal fraternity". Both Ángel María Dieppa and Juan José López argued that anarchism was the way to "harmony", the first labeling it "perfect order without government" and the second a way for "new days, more environment, mate light, more teachings, more realities, more hope [and] a life of cooing and love". Local anarchists expressed their beliefs through pro-revolutionary poetry, stories and plays, all as a manifestation of the desire to abolish the higher classes as the means to secure a social equality. Both Juan José López and Romero Rosa wrote fictionalized accounts of violence being used to bring fort a "social revolution". Initially the Puerto Rican anarchists used the red flag associated with socialism, despite belonging to their own subgroup and their collaboration being only on matters of common interests.

=== Religion ===
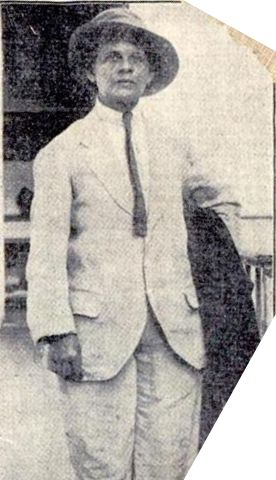
Luisa Captillo wearing men's clothing.

Puerto Rican anarchists were distinctly anti-religion and pro-naturalism, with López claiming that it would open the way to eradicating "the monopoly of instructive schools, with the free teaching of rationalism and humanities", free of what he considered "mystical ideas". Romero Rosa was the leftist standard bearer against the Catholic Church, attacking it in 1899 and again in 1904's La cuestión social y Puerto Rico where he attacked it as an "instrument" of capitalism. Ferrer y Ferrer considered the figure of Satan ideal, as he was "free and emancipated". Several considered the teachings of Jesus an early example of anarchic social communism, and argued that he was a rationalist teacher.

Capetillo argued in favor of Espiritismo and also urged anarchists to study the writings of Krishna, Emperor Yao, Confucius, Philo and Jesus, in order to understand their ideas about love. Despite her support for Espiritismo, she urged not to become involved with organized religion. Capetillo's belief was influenced by the work of Leo Tolstoy and she believed that an anarchist life would result in the ideal outliving the physical body and being reborn through reincarnation. Vilar was also interested in Espiritismo and wrote on the individual's "essence" and physical/spiritual components of Nature, which was part of a reciprocal relationship in which spiritists also supported turning their center into "schools that followed rationalist and lay principles", his main protect. Besides their disdain for organized religion, both groups overlap on some issues during the early 20th century, opposing the death penalty and the consumption of alcohol, as well as pushing for the involvement of more women in their initiatives. This lasted until 1911, when Espiritistas began to distance themselves from class issues. Others, like Juan José López disregarded Espiritismo along the other religions.

Despite a general anti-organized religion posture, the idealism of Puerto Rican anarchism led to a phenomenon where some adopted the practice of santos laicos or "secular saints", a monk-like life style that involved renouncing addictive substances like tobacco or alcohol and living their life to denounce them as vices that "corrupted" the working class and "brought misery".

=== Progressivism ===
Capetillo recognized the uncertainty of the future as abstract and "utopic" in nature, but goals and ideas as more concrete and practical. Despite this, some like Venacio Cruz considered the downfall of "bourgeois society" inevitable, and "complete liberation" only a matter of time. Others within the movement, like Fra Filipo, felt that only unions and syndicates would be able to accomplish this goal. Class war was seen as a facilitator for worker class opposition and the motivator of "revolutionary" ideals. Dieppa also believed that no matter how revolutionary their actions at the time were, they would seem unimpressive and "conservative" to future generations. This call was done despite knowing well that they were perceived discordantly by a large segment of the population, either as violent or as delusional.

=== Political status of Puerto Rico ===
A perception that the independence movement was being pushed onwards by members of the higher classes and had become elitist, as well as influence from the AFL and the idea that foreign involvement could help in local confrontations with patrons, moved the mainstream working class towards an annexationist approach as far as political status was concerned. As the devaluation of the Puerto Rican coin in favor of the USD resulted in most of the viable terrains being acquired by American interests, the AFL gained increasing influence over the local labor movement. Anarchists, however, grew increasingly uncomfortable with the "Americanization" efforts taking place on Puerto Rico and directed their suspicions at the AFL's role within them.

As such, they adopted an anti-nationalist stance, but also remained distant from the annexationist ideas. They ultimately rejected all of the political status options offered to Puerto Rico, considering them unsatisfactory and unrevolutionary, instead promoting anarcho-syndicalism as the real solution. Sandalio Marcial attacked the Union Party on the topic, arguing that the institution did not argue in favor of removing power from the capitalists and that Puerto Rico would still remain economically tied to the United States, a type of "bourgeois independence". In 1914's Cuatro siglos de ignorancia y servidumbre en Puerto Rico, socialist Rojas argued that even if Puerto Rico became independent, the economy would be in the hands of "foreign capitalists" and argued that in order to overcome capitalism, patriotic ideas would need to be pushed out so that a unified front could emerge between all of the left's spectrum.

=== Collaboration ===
In Puerto Rico, the anarchist movement opposed the influence of the AFL, the politics of the United States, the influence of the Catholic Church and other institutions that they regarded as imposing on the freedom of Puerto Ricans. Alliances were promoted and in the long run, they created alliances with groups as diverse as the freethinkers and the Espiritistas (based on sharing a common interest in their opposition of the Catholic Church) with the posture of some like Capetillo facilitating these links. Vilar also participated in loose associations with members of the FLT and PS, collaborating in common interests. During the 1910s, Bayamón anarchists collaborated with the New York-based Cultura Obrera and Brazo y Cerebro, which were also distributed locally among other foreign publications. During the 1920s, the Soviet-influenced El Comunista would publish articles that adopted an anarchist perspective and even feature Ventura Cruz as a collaborator, this before the confrontations between anarchists and Bolsheviks during the October Revolution.

Puerto Rican anarchism is based both locally and in the states, depending on the migration waves throughout history. Early on, its members established themselves within the tobacco workers in New York, Florida and Cuba, where they became involved with local anarchist movements and collaborate with the publishing of propaganda. This characteristic allowed them to forge connections and create international networks within Latin America and the United States. Years after the Cuban-based newspaper ¡Tierra! was closed down by its government, the Bayamón-based El Comunista was created and gained visibility within the Spanish-speaking anarchists, becoming widely distributed locally and internationally. Local propaganda was influenced by a number of foreign books that were distributed in locales, activities and through mail and through formal distribution companies. Correspondence with foreign anarchists and publications further expanded the local ideal, which still exhibited deviations from the European ideas. Anarchist newspapers also collaborated in inter-municipal networks to share resources and content. Puerto Rican anarchists made use of leftist plays that were staged for the public and written abroad for similar purposes. This was one of several efforts of coordination with anarchist organizations in Latin America (i.e. Havana) and the United States (i.e. New York and Tampa), both due to cultural ties and the migration patterns.

=== Democracy ===
Among the more militant sector of anarchism, American democracy was treated as fraudulent and as a refuge for the affluent, calls were made not to participate in the elections. As the support for the United States grew among the working class, Juan José López cautioned against it by citing incidents such as the Haymarket affair and its ramifications, Tampa cigar makers' strike and the confrontations between the federal government and the Industrial Workers of the World, the case of Simón Radowitzky, among other examples against the ideas of Republic-based democracy. He criticized the colonial administration for employing the police to counter strikes and called those that still believed in the American flag and constitution "fools", insinuated that the working class leaders had become tools and only served to discredit the class struggle.

However, an internal dichotomy had emerged early on between figures like Alfredo Negrín, Juan Vilar and Venacio Cruz, who at this point openly disregarded political parties and opposed the FLT and figures like Capetillo and Ferrer y Ferrer who saw some use in them. In respect to this, Ferrer y Ferrer pointed towards the tribal nature of non-working class political parties and accused them of favoritism and perpetuating the power of patrons, he also warned about benefits being offered to quell revolutionary ideas. Cruz equated politics to a "vengeful tribunal" that was established to keep an "iron grip" over the people and that the more that power is legitimized, the more the need for "slaves" would grow. Dieppa, in turn, argued the role of the "social contract" as a tool of capitalism and expressed that politics were used to deepen divisions that distracted from the "true freedom" of Puerto Rico. Romero Rosa accused politicians of only "trying to get a hold of the tit" and disregarding their constituents. Cándido Ruibola summarized the stance by stating that "as long as there are governors and governed, there can't be a [functional] society [...] since all rights are restricted". This antagonism extended to other elements that were believed to be collaborative of this beyond the government itself and patrons/business owners, such as the police.

They also disregarded the Republican model as "absurd" and as just another form of authority equivalent to monarchies or even empires, also refusing to grant legitimacy to any Constitution. They also separated anarchism from socialism in their discourse and considered the latter inferior, criticized parliamentarian socialism, considering that it had grown obsolete and was inherently unbalanced, with individuals consuming more than they worked to produce. They saw the local Partido Socialista Republicano as only interested in winning elections, had grown conformist and lacking a revolutionary cause. In essence, they considered it an idea "of authoritarian legalism". Despite this, they still made references to the red flag -red specter or red struggle- despite this growing distanced from anarchism throughout the world and instead becoming a communist symbol.

=== Social issues and gender roles ===
In sociological terms, anarchists believed that wealth was unfairly distributed as a result of a lack of morals inherent to capitalism, which they equaled to feudalism and slavery in terms of dependence on the "exploitation" of the lower classes. Capetillo labeled it "salaried slavery" and considered it even worse than the classical versions. Believing that most inmates ended as such due to lack of education or resources, they condemned the penitentiary system, considering it nothing but a form of punishment that didn't rehabilitate them. Anarchists actually lobbied for the abolishment of the system and its replacement with industrial schools.

Prostitution was a contentious topic, which most anarchists considering it a manifestation of the "social condition", misery and outdated education and condemned its practice, all the while separating it from the women whom they considered were being exploited. Capetillo advocated anarcho-naturalist postures that argued for sexual liberalization. She was one of the few anarchists that saw prostitution as a way for both sexes to satisfy natural urges without the need for masturbation, which perceived as unnatural, and not as something necessarily negative. On the other extreme, Vilar despised prostitution, seeing it as another byproduct of capitalism.

Marriage was also considered a form of slavery, claiming that it "caged" individuals and distracted them from their ideals, in practice preventing them from rebelling. Emiliano Ramos was another anarchist that advocated "free love". In this same line, anarchists believed that anyone that didn't believe in their concept of free love was either "hypocritical or ignorant". In regards to the role of women in society, Capetillo advocated that they should be able to become activists in her "utopia". Capetillo protested "enslaving" gender roles and argued that if women were supposed to teach children, it made no sense to only teach them how to do housework. Ultimately, she concluded that such a family was only possible in an anarcho-communist society. Dieppa was more paternalistic regarding the role of women in an anarchist society, where they would perform work adequate to them and focus on educating the children in their ways after pregnancy.

== Puerto Rican anarchist literature ==
Entering the 1890s, the Centro de Estudios Sociales, a distinctly leftist organization with heavy anarchist presence, was created as a propaganda tool where anarchist publications were available for free. The colonial government was vigilant of the entity. During this decade, Puerto Rican anarchists joined libertarian and pro-revolution socialists in the creation of a labor movement with the foundation of the Federación Regional de Trabajadores and the Federación Libre de Trabajadores. The tobacco industry was their main origin, with the municipalities if Caguas, Bayamón and San Juan serving as their main bastions. This line of work also influenced the migration of these workers, along their ideology, to other locations in Latin America and the United States. Coming in contact with other anarchists abroad allowed the flow of information to and from Puerto Rico, leading to a symbiosis of information and identifying parallel issues. The FLT and FRT would publish two socialist publications, Ensayo Obrero and El Porvenir Social, which featured some anarchist authors. The former was edited by Ferrer, Gómez and Romero, adopting broad pro-socialist stances with an emphasis on anarchism, which were later adopted by the latter.

In 1905, Juan Vilar published the first local anarchist publication, Voz Humana (1905–06) at Caguas. Bayamón and Caguas would serve as base for the publications that followed during the following decade and a half. However, most of these were short-lived. Vilar also collaborated with anarchist publications from abroad, such as ¡Tierra!, which would eventually find their way back to Puerto Rico. Local anarchists would also make use of other newspapers through correspondence, in which they attacked their opponents and exposed their visions for the future. Despite the FLT becoming affiliated with the AFL, anarchists would use their publications to publish their messages, but not without being critical of the first. Publications with ties to the freethinkers and Espiritismo were used. However, the international anarchist press was used prominently to coordinate.

Papers such as El Despertar and ¡Tierra! (since at least October 1903) formed part if this network, with the second being invested in and brought back to Puerto Rico after printing and distributed. Juan Vilar and Pablo Vega Santos lead funding efforts for at least 99 of ¡Tierra!'s issues, which were headlined by Caguas and San Juan but included at least a dozen municipalities. During the 1910s, the Puerto Rican anarchists based in New York established a link with the publications Cultura Obrera and Cultura Proletaria property of Pedro Esteve, using both as outlets. Sympathizers in Puerto Rico would fund international anarchist initiatives. Local authors would write columns in these papers, creating links between groups. Tobacco factories, cafés and other working class establishments were used prominently in the distributions of these papers. Books also appeared, like Venacio Cruz's Hacia el porvenir and Luisa Capetillo's Ensayos libertarios (1907), Influencias de las de las ideas modernas (1910), Mi opinión sobre las libertades, derechos y deberes de la mujer como compañera, madre y ser independiente (1911), Influencias de las de las ideas modernas (1916) and Ángel María Dieppa's El porvenir de la sociedad humano (1915) defined the heterogenous ideals of Puerto Rican anarchism in written form.

When writing their propaganda fliers/booklets and newspapers, anarchists were open about possessing subpar literacy, blaming societal norms for this and employing it as a method to distance themselves from the upper classes. In their works, Puerto Rican anarchists expressed the belief that science had become a tool for capitalism and only served the rich and powerful, also caricaturing the formally educated as pretentious and "evil", being capable of perceiving the evils of the world but not of doing enough to counter them. They also held the belief that even those workers that became fully literate would need extended exposure to the working class, or risk becoming assimilated into the ways of capitalist society. Early on, individuals like Romero Rosa and Ferrer y Ferrer were responsible for collaborating with several newspapers, while others such as the working class La Miseria allowed space for anarchists despite a possessing broader scope. In April 1901, they published an article attributed to Charles Pelletier and which directly defends anarchy, as well as poetry praising the philosophy.

In 1902, Pedro Goyco published the satirical El Anárquista joining organized groups such as ¡Solidaridad! (Ferrer y Ferrer, et al.) and their Adelante newspaper. The latter would then become Voz Humana in 1904, published by the same "center for social studies" in Caguas, and was open about its anarchist leanings to the extent of offering the work of several authors along the subscription. This paper encouraged the Caguas-Cayey Johnson tobacco factory strike by publishing a manifesto drafted by the employees. This move led to protests in other factories, namely Turina and Quiñones. Voz Humana made a number of approaches abroad, collaborating with the Catalan ¡Salud y Fuerza! and contacting the adjacent El Productor Libertario, as well as a number of Spanish newspapers including Tierra y Libertad, El Porvenir del Obrero, El Proletario and La Voz del Cantero. Its closest international contact was with ¡Tierra! from Havana, which had subscribers in at least eleven Puerto Rican municipalities. In exchange, authors like Juan Osorio, Alfonso Torres and Paca Escabí wrote for the Cuban newspaper.

Ferrer y Ferrer would also be involved in 1904–06's Humanidad Libre (along founder Juan Vilar, Prudencio Rivera Martínez, Tadeo Rodríguez and Pedro San Miguel), Hijo del Pueblo (along Venacio Ortítz) and Avante (along Vilar, Rivera, San Miguel, Rodríguez, Antonio Arroyo and Pablo Vega Santos). Voz Humana's tendency to publish earnings, spendings and subscriber lists provided enough information for the use in police raids, ergo, using pseudonyms (such as Ferrer y Ferrer's "Rabachol") and systematically creating several newspapers became a common practice that served as a way to avoid government censorship or starting a new publication after the former one ran out of funding. Other works include Juan José López's Voces libertarias and Juan Vilar's Páginas libres. Other sources would also contribute to the spreading of anarchist literature. A number of publications unrelated to the philosophy, like El Combate, La Sotana and El Obrero Libre gave their ideas space for articles. By 1909, the tobacco workers introduced the newspaper Nuevos Horizontes. That same year, members of the FLT began publishing Luz y Vida magazine, publishing the work of Juan Montseny Carret and covering figures like Francesc Pi i Margall and Pierre-Joseph Proudhon, among other working class topics. In 1910, a group that included San Miguel and Rivera Martínez founded the Club Ideas Nuevas, a repository of liberal literature, and adopted the magazine.

In 1920, the anarcho-communist publication El Comunista began being published in Bayamón, finding its way to international anarchist organizations. Following the Red Scare, the American colonial administration intervened with this group, amidst a reactionary popularization among Latino anarchists in the United States that had resulted in investment coming from abroad. The move concluded in the closing of the newspaper and the destabilization of the Puerto Rican anarchist movement.

== Legacy and influence ==
=== Academic study ===
Anarchism in the Caribbean as a whole remained unpopular among historians until the 1990s. While the local labor movement had been studied and documented for decades, mentions of the role of anarchists within it were scarce, brief and/or negative. In literary works, anarchism has been used as a replacement for disorder, as was the case of Concepción G. de Font's Anarquía Monetaria which had related to coin exchange and had little relevance to the political definition of the term. When covering a series of strikes held by the Republican José Mauleón, Fernando J. Matías employed the term despite the disorder being in support of a political party in an antithesis of the local practices of the anarchism movement. Cartoonish depictions of anarchists were also present in books, as was the case in Planta Maldita (authored by socialist activist José Elías Levis Bernard). The local movement did get occasional mentions in work published abroad, such as Anarchy: A Journal of Desire Armed. The exploits of Capetillo also gathered attention and she remains the most studied figure within the labor movement of Puerto Rico, gaining the nickname the "Red Emma Goldman of the Caribbean".

Local academics in general, did not cover anarchism in their works. However, foreign authors did mention it, such as Max Nettlau in his 1927 piece Contribución a la bibliografía anarquista de la América Latina hasta 1914, in which Voz Humana is discussed as a libertarian publication. In Historia social latinoamericana Carlos Rama made passing reference to the International's presence in the Caribbean. This author later collaborated with Ángel J. Cappelletti in El anarquísmo en América Latina which analyzes Puerto Rican anarchism and traces its roots to similar Spanish movements, also discussing their anti-American postures as consequence of the direct relation with capitalism. In Anarquistas en América Latina David Viñas discusses local anarchism and granted some credit to the literates, besides the working class, in its creation. In his book The Cuban Revolution: A Critical Perspective, Sam Dolgoff cites this as an example of "how little it is known about the anarcho-syndicalist origins of the labor and socialist movements in the Caribbean area".

During the 1970s, while the local economy has shifted from agrarian to increasingly industrial, some Puerto Rican academics incorporated the ideology to their curriculum, but faced opposition by the dominant Marxist leanings present within the community and was locked in an ideological dispute with it. Most of these works questioned the historical narrative that had been adopted since the beginning of that century (which persists today) and introduced the working class as a historical presence that had been omitted, in part due to individuals like Salvador Brau, José Julián Acosta or Cayetano Coll y Toste belonging to a wealthier class. Ángel Quintero Rivera's Lucha obrera en Puerto Rico combined with a series of relevant works, which were the basis to create a local study of the history of the working class. The American interventionism in Latin America also emphasized a sociocultural stance among the local pro-independence and socialist groups that influenced this process and facilitated the creation of revisionist academic groups.

César Andreu Iglesias felt that anarcho-syndicalists were the first ideological influence in the Puerto Rican working movement, citing other examples in Latin America. However, Ángel G. Quintero felt that there were deeper circumstances that allowed for this ideology to take hold. Gervasio L. García traces this to socialist libertarian tendencies among the tobacco workers and the "proletarianization" of cigarmakers. In Apuntes para la historia del movimiento obrero puertorriqueño, Juan Ángel Silén cited some early anarchist work and argued its place in local history.

The centralization of Iglesias Pantín's role and the claim that the American invasion ignited the organization of the working class would remain the predominant posture among local historians until the 1970s, when institutions like the Centro de Estudios de la Realidad Puertorriqueña (CEREP) and individuals like Amílcar Tirado Avilés established that there already were stages of proto-organization prior to it. During the 1980s, Rubén Dávila Santiago published works documenting and supporting libertarian socialism from a cultural perspective, Teatro obrero en Puerto Rico (1900-1920) and El derribo de las murallas: Orígenes intelectuales del socialismo en Puerto Rico. This author's work on the labor movement included Ramón Romero Rosa's play Rebeldías and a couple written by Capetillo. In Historia crítica, historia sin coartadas: Algunos problemas de la historia de Puerto Rico, Gervasio L. García argues that anarchism had been relevant until the end of the 19th century and lost by the 20th.

In 1990, Norma Valle Ferrer published a feminist take on the life of Luisa Capetillo, Historia de una mujer proscrita, establishing parallels between her and Emma Goldman. Two years later, Julio Ramos published Amor y anárquia: Los escritos de Luisa Capetillo. García and Ángel G. Quintero discussed the influences of international anarchism and socialism during the early stages of the literate working class in 'Desafio y solidaridad: Breve historia del movimiento obrero puertorriqueño (1997). In her collaboration for 1998's Identity and Struggle and the Margins of the Nation-State: The Laboring Peoples of Central America and the Hispanic Caribbean, Eileen J. Findlay offers an insight on gender perception within anarchists of the early 20th century. In general, Puerto Rican anarchism was avoided by historians in favor of positivist approach that emphasizes select figures instead of movements. During the 1970s, the first attempts to create a parallel narrative were made.

In 2005, Carmen Centeno Añeses published Modernidad y resistencia, a study of working class literature from the early 20th century. unlike others that preceded her, she included Venacio Cruz in her research. In 2008, Arturo Bird Carmona published an analysis of early 20th-century tobacco workers at Puerta de Tierra titled Parejeros y desafiantes, including an ongoing dichotomy between union and anarchist workers. He documented the impact of pre-Partido Socialista anarchists within the tobacco workers of Puerta de a Tierra in San Juan. In 2013's Black Flag Boricuas, author Kirwing R. Schaffer summarized the environment at Puerto Rico as "twentieth-century anarchists dealing with twentieth-century colonialism". In this respect, the author considered that "the anarchist experience in Puerto Rico was unique in the Americas", since they faced a colonial government (and hence a double fight against local and American interests) instead of a national government. Upper class teen aged girls that came in the contact with anarchist literature became the symbol used in books and plays to portray a social "awakening".

=== Popular culture ===
Since the 1890s and following the turn of the century, the local media used "anarchism" as a negative term, as something foreign (one, in particular, cites the "miserable" parts of Paris, London or Madrid as its source), self-destructing, capable of destroying Puerto Rican society and preventing its development. Even publications linked to the working class were involved in this tendency. Nowadays, the perception of anarchist as destructive remains within the conservative media, as was the case of El Vocero extrapolating the main motivation of the 2010–11 UPR strikes to it. Others, such as centrist El Nuevo Día, have used the term as a substitute for "chaos". Prior to this, the 1892 publication El Eco Proletario: Semanario consagrado a la defensa de la clase obrera promoted the creation of unions, but advocated against strikes and was skeptical about anarchism.

Within the left, it fared better. Anarchist-friendly newspapers included Voz Humana, El Eco del Torcedor, El Sentinela and Nuevo Horizonte. The FLT's Luz y Vida also published their pieces. In El Centinela, Severo Cirino advocated and republished the idea about "class parties and workers unions" that came from Europe. In 1910's Vida nueva socialist José Elías Levis Bernard portrays his ideas of anarchism through the carácter of "Lisí Archeval". Likewise -while members of the PS- Juan Marcano and Magdaleno González still wrote positively about anarchism in 1919's Páginas rojas. Despite leaving anarchism for socialism, Plaza depicts a sympathetic depiction of anarchy in 1920's ¡Futuro! in the form of main character "Rosa".

In recent artistic manifestation, vocalist René Peréz of Calle 13 has self-identified as anarchist in his single Mis disculpas, having also previously touched on the topic in another song, Vamos a Portarnos Mal.

== See also ==
- Category:Puerto Rican anarchists
- List of anarchist movements by region
- Anarchism in Cuba
- Anarchism in the Dominican Republic
- Anarchism in the United States
