= Mi opinión sobre las libertades, derechos y deberes de la mujer como compañera, madre y ser independiente =

1911 Puerto Rican book

- Author: Luisa Capetillo
- Language: Spanish
- Publisher: San Juan: Times Publishing Company (Spanish 1st. ed); Houston: Arte Público Press (English 1st. ed)
- Publication date: 1911
- English publication date: 2004
- ISBN: 978-1-6119-2231-8 (English 1st. ed)

Mi opinión sobre las libertades, derechos y deberes de la mujer como compañera, madre y ser independiente (transl. 'My Opinion on the Freedoms, Rights, and Duties of Women as Partners, Mothers, and Independent Beings', often called Mi opinión) (Note: See Hewitt and Valle Ferrer.) is a 1911 book by Puerto Rican anarchist and feminist Luisa Capetillo. First published in San Juan by the Times Publishing Company, the book includes essays discussing marriage, sex education, sex work, women's history, and women's rights. A second edition was published by Joaquin Mascufiana Press in Tampa, Florida, in 1913. It was officially translated into English by Alan West-Duran under the title A Nation of Women: An Early Feminist Speaks Out: Mi Opinion Sobre Las Libertades, Derechos y Deberes de La Mujer.

== Sources ==
- Hewitt, Nancy A. (2005). "Luisa Capetillo: Feminist of the Working Class". In Ruíz, Vicki; Korrol, Virginia Sánchez (eds.). Latina Legacies: Identity, Biography, and Community. New York: Oxford University Press. pp. 120–134. ISBN 978-0-19-515398-9.
- Matos Rodríguez, Felix V. (2004). Introduction. A Nation of Women: An Early Feminist Speaks Out: Mi Opinion Sobre Las Libertades, Derechos y Deberes de La Mujer. By Capetillo, Luisa. Houston: Arte Público Press. pp. vii–li. ISBN 978-1-61192-231-8.
- Ramos, Julio, ed. (2022). "Cronología mínima de Capetillo" [Short Chronology of Capetillo]. Amor y anarquía: Escritos de Luisa Capetillo [Love and Anarchy: Writings of Luisa Capetillo] (in Spanish). Cabo Rojo: Editora Educación Emergente. pp. 55–56.
- Tinajero, Araceli (2010). El Lector: A History of the Cigar Factory Reader. University of Texas Press. ISBN 978-0-292-72175-3.
- Valle Ferrer, Norma (2006). Luisa Capetillo, Pioneer Puerto Rican Feminist. Translated by Waldman-Schwartz, Gloria. New York: Peter Lang. ISBN 978-0-8204-4285-3. NOTE: While Waldman-Schwartz is listed as the official translator, the book was actually translated by a team of students led by her. These students include Carolyn F. Castro Báez, Verónica Cabrera Velarde, Carmen M. Espada, Ivonne López, Zaida M. Negrón, Eunice Rodríguez, and María B. Vásquez Lloréns.
