= Ensayos libertarios =

1907 Puerto Rican essay collection

- Author: Luisa Capetillo
- Language: Spanish
- Publication date: 1907

Ensayos libertarios (transl. 'Libertarian Essays') is a 1907 essay collection by Puerto Rican anarchist Luisa Capetillo. Written between 1904 and 1907, it discusses Capetillo's ideas for an egalitarian society in Puerto Rico. In it, she portrays life as a conflict between workers and capitalists and accuses the clergy of hypocrisy and selfishness.

== Sources ==
- Hewitt, Nancy A. (2005). "Luisa Capetillo: Feminist of the Working Class". In Ruíz, Vicki; Korrol, Virginia Sánchez (eds.). Latina Legacies: Identity, Biography, and Community. New York: Oxford University Press. pp. 120–134. ISBN 978-0-19-515398-9.
- Tinajero, Araceli (2010). El Lector: A History of the Cigar Factory Reader. University of Texas Press. ISBN 978-0-292-72175-3.
- Valle Ferrer, Norma (2006). Luisa Capetillo, Pioneer Puerto Rican Feminist. Translated by Waldman-Schwartz, Gloria. New York: Peter Lang. ISBN 978-0-8204-4285-3. NOTE: While Waldman-Schwartz is listed as the official translator, the book was actually translated by a team of students led by her. These students include Carolyn F. Castro Báez, Verónica Cabrera Velarde, Carmen M. Espada, Ivonne López, Zaida M. Negrón, Eunice Rodríguez, and María B. Vásquez Lloréns.
