= Ybor City cigar makers' strike of 1931 =

Industry strike

1931 Ybor cigar makers' strike
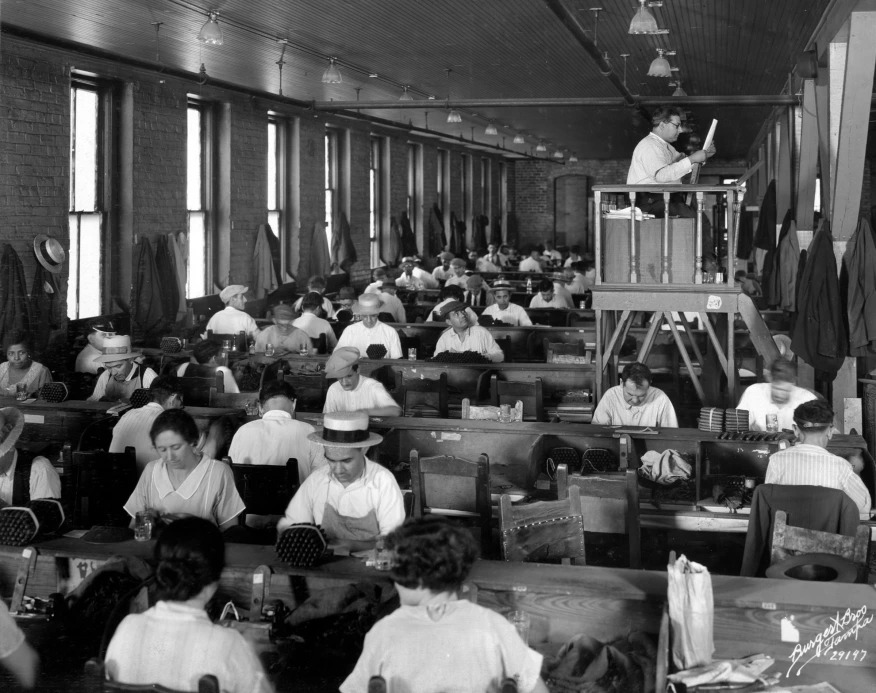
- Lector reading at Cuesta-Rey Cigar Company, Tampa, 1929
- Date: November 26, - December 11, 1931
- Location: Ybor City, Tampa, Fl
- Caused by: Elimination of the lector

Parties
Striking workers Trade Union Unity League	Cigar Companies Tampa Police Ku Klux Klan

Number
8,000 workers	

The Ybor cigar makers' strike of 1931 took place in Ybor City, Tampa, Florida, starting on November 26 and ended in December. Some strikers were jailed, "Lectors" were banned and there was a lockout. Following legal intervention, some workers returned to work at previous wage levels but others were not re-employed. Lectors had by tradition been elected by the workers and, as well as reading aloud newspaper articles, often from left-wing radical publications, they recited and acted more generally, including from classic works – effectively they provided a form of education for illiterate workers. The most significant effect of the strike in the longer term was that the lector culture was brought to an end.

== Summary ==
The Tampa cigar makers' strike took place in Ybor City, Florida from November to December 1931. It was made up of a highly unionized, militant cigar maker workforce who had a long history of radical labor–management relations dating back to the 1880s when Cuban immigrants first began building the Florida cigar industry.

Due to rising unemployment and falling wages in the wake of the Great Depression, workers of the Tobacco Workers Industrial Union engaged in radical demonstrations, most notably, the celebration of the anniversary of the Russian Revolution. In doing so, 17 workers were jailed. This sparked a preliminary walkout by workers but more importantly prompted factory owners to expel the widely renowned "Lector" in the cigar factories. This "Lector" was a fellow worker who would read aloud newspapers and literature to an illiterate Cuban workforce during production periods to keep workers' minds occupied. The readings were very often pro-union, leftist and anti-corporation.

After the displays of radicalism from the Cuban workers, factory owners accused the Lector of proliferating Communist propaganda and banned him from the workplace. This was a bitter loss for the workers and led to a three-week strike in which vigilante squads, the police and the Ku Klux Klan clashed with affiliates of the Trade Union Unity League of the Communist Party, a branch of the Tobacco Workers Industrial Union. The strike finally ended on December 15, 1931.

The Lector, replaced by a radio, was never returned to the workplace. The significance of the 1931 Tampa Cigar Makers Strike is that despite a highly unionized workforce, and despite a constitutionally backed argument for the right to free speech, it spelled the end of an age-old, artisan privilege for the cigar workers who were falling prey to the new, industrial age setting in on the United States.

== Background ==
During the 1860s, conflict in Cuba between the Spanish colonial government and Cuban nationalists encouraged widespread immigration into the US. In 1867 alone, 100,000 Cubans, mostly made up of highly skilled laborers coming from the cigar industry, immigrated into Florida thus providing the labor necessary to drive the cigar industry.

Vicente Martinez Ybor was one of the first cigar manufacturers to immigrate. With the help of Tampa's Board of Trade, he bought a $9,000 tract of land just outside Tampa's city limit. He named his plot of land Ybor City and quickly built a factory and housing for Cuban and Spanish cigar makers who in 1886 began production of fine, handmade cigars that gave Tampa national recognition. From 1887 to World War II Ybor City was a company town dominated by the cigar industry. By 1910, Tampa was producing one million cigars per day and its 10,000 cigar workers represented over half of the community's entire labor force.

The influx of Cuban, Spanish and Italian workers made Ybor City and the encompassing Tampa region a vibrant, radical and ethnically diverse community interested in politics and ideology. Early in their history, the militant unionism of Cuban workers is evident. After the failed Cuban revolution in 1868, the Cuban Nationalist movement continued to grow in Key West, and, when Cuban independence began to dim in the 1870s, workers turned towards trade unionism with even more vigor. La Resistencia was formed in 1895 as a social group for Tampa cigar workers and transformed into a very powerful trade union. It fostered links between cigar industry workers in Tampa and workers in Havana, Cuba thus becoming an effective force for organizing workers and leading successful strikes in 1899 and 1901. After the strike of 1901, La Resistencia declined in importance and the Cigar Makers International Union replaced it as the chief labor organization in Tampa.

Historian Robert Kerstein writes that early twentieth-century Tampa continued to experience frequent labor conflicts, as tensions grew between cigar manufacturers and the city's immigrant workforce. Efforts to impose tighter production quotas and enforce corporate efficiency standards heightened worker resistance and helped set the stage for later major strikes.

By 1910, the cigar industry's labor force was 41 percent Cuban, 23 percent Spanish and 19 percent Italian. These workers were radical and would form clubs and discussion groups devoted to a wide range of socialist and anarchist causes. Additionally, they supported numerous radical newspapers such as El Internacional and La Voce Dello Shiavo ("The Voice of the Slave") – an evocation of workers' feelings during those times. The Tampa Citizen was a newspaper published by local unions during and after WW II with the central ideology that it is "Published In The Interest Of The Working Class Of Tampa." As such, workers were deeply entrenched in the radical labor movement taking place in the United States.

Historian Susan Greenbaum notes that Afro-Cubans played a significant role in Tampa's labor and political life during the early twentieth century. They formed their own mutual-aid societies and political clubs, which helped support broader organizing efforts in Ybor City. Although Afro-Cubans were active participants, Greenbaum explains that racial divisions in Tampa meant that their contributions were often overlooked, and solidarity across racial groups was limited. This helps explain why many of the protest actions leading up to the 1931 strike were centered within the Spanish-speaking communities but did not fully involve Anglo-American or African American workers.

Historian Gary Mormino writes that Italian immigrants formed an important part of Ybor City's multiethnic workforce during the early twentieth century. Although many Italians arrived later than Cuban and Spanish cigar makers, they gradually integrated into the cigar industry through family networks and on-the-job apprenticeship. Italians also participated actively in the city's radical political culture, joining socialist and anarchist clubs and relying on mutual-aid societies that offered social support to immigrant workers. Mormino notes that despite occasional cultural tensions among the city's ethnic groups, Italian workers frequently aligned themselves with Cuban and Spanish cigar makers during labor disputes, strengthening interethnic solidarity in Ybor City's labor movement.

After 1900, large American corporations such as the American Cigar Company and the Duke Tobacco Trust bought many Tampa cigar factories bringing a corporate attitude that would not be able to peacefully co-exist with worker radicalism and militancy. Corporate culture introduced a drive for greater efficiency via production quotas. New rules, such as requiring a certain number of cigars to be rolled from an exact weight of tobacco distributed to rollers, prompted greater worker resistance and more strikes. Consequently, labor-management relations were characterized by frequent strikes, walkouts, lockouts and incidents of mob violence and vigilantism. In their struggles with manufacturers, cigar workers had more leverage than the average factory worker because they were highly skilled and had an enormous sense of solidarity. For this reason, they were hard to replace and were able to survive strikes by sticking together in the larger Cuban/Spanish communities across Key West and Havana.

== Women and Family Roles ==
Although women were not formally employed as cigar strikers in 1931, they played an essential role in sustaining Ybor City's immigrant labor community during periods of economic conflict. Historian Nancy A. Hewitt notes that Cuban, Spanish, and Italian women were central to family survival and community cohesion, often managing household budgets, organizing mutual-aid support, and providing food and childcare that enabled men to participate fully in labor activism.

Many Latin women were also politically informed and participated in discussions about nationalism, labor rights, and social justice through their involvement in ethnic clubs and mutual-aid societies. Their unpaid and often overlooked labor helped maintain community solidarity during strikes and economic downturns, making them a significant part of Tampa's labor history.

== The Lector ==
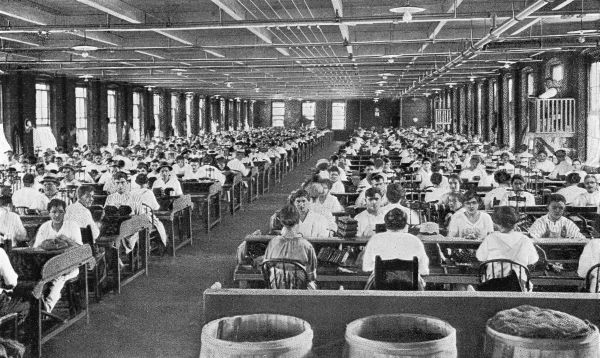
Large cigar factory with two lectors shown on the right side, Tampa, circa 1900

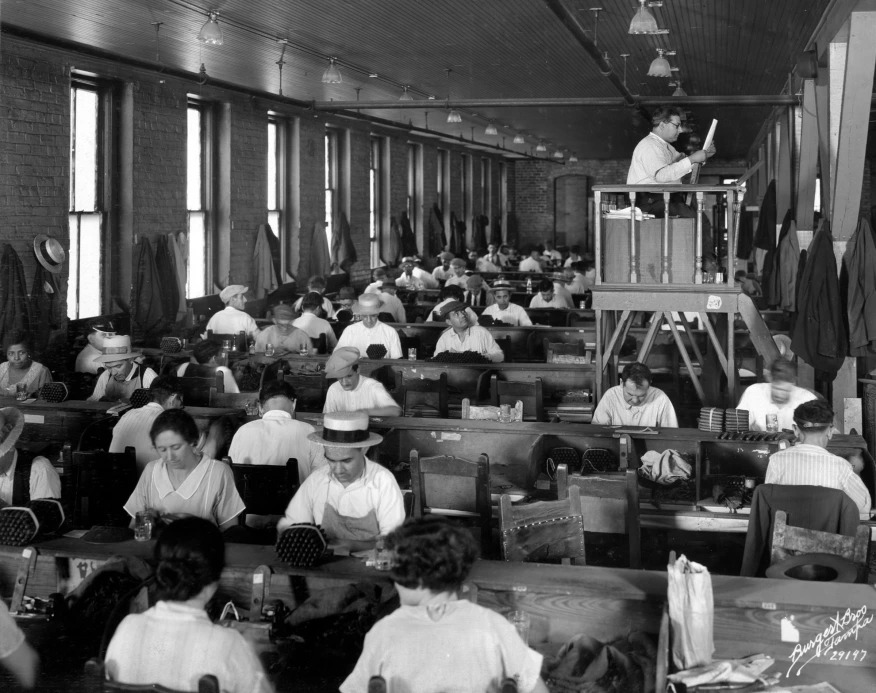
Lector reading at Cuesta-Rey Cigar Company, Tampa, 1929

The best reflection of the sentiments of immigrant cigar workers was the factory "Lector" or "Reader". The workers would each give 25 to 50 cents of their weekly salary to elect a fellow workman to act as a "Lector" in which he would read aloud various materials such as newspapers mentioned above or others such as The Daily Worker and Socialist Call, or works of literature written by authors such as Tolstoy or Dickens.

The readers, elected by their peers, were actually highly theatrical and would not simply read the book but literally act out the scenes in a dramatic fashion upon a podium set up in the middle of the factory. Therefore, many illiterate cigar makers were well-versed in subjects such as politics, labor relations, literature, and international relations. According to Tampa's leading anarchist, Alfonso Coniglio, a cigar maker at the age of 14, "to them [the lectors] we owe particularly our sense of the class struggle". This sense of class struggle drove the workers to resist poor working conditions and to fight for more rights. Strikes by Tampa's cigar workers were rarely focused on issues of wages and hours but instead on being able to control their working conditions. The Lector, in particular, was crucial to the workers' conditions and something that would spark an 8,000-person strike to keep in place.

== Timeline ==
The Great Depression had taken its effect on the industry, creating rising unemployment and falling wage rates. Additionally, demand for luxury cigars fell and manufacturers around the country shifted to increased production of cheap cigars that could be made by machine and sold for as little as five cents each. Despite this, Tampa's cigar makers resisted change by defending wage scales and traditional work practices.

By 1931 they rejected the conservative Cigar Makers' International Union, which was an affiliate of the American Federation of Labor, and 5,000 of them poured into the Tobacco Workers Industrial Union, an affiliate of the Trade Union Unity League of the Communist Party.

=== Initial conflict ===
By November 1931 the workers were actively engaging in radical demonstrations, most notably the public celebration of the fourteenth anniversary of the Russian Revolution. This provoked public officials and vigilante squads, many times working together, to come down on the radical workers. Vigilante squads were never once arrested, indicted or penalized for taking the law into their own hands to take action against striking cigar makers. Specifically, one party organizer was kidnapped and flogged by unknown assailants.

But what angered the strikers most was that seventeen workers were sent to jail, where they sent this letter to their counterparts:

"All of us, the imprisoned co-workers, are ill because of the horrible dampness that exists in the cell they've had us locked up in since last Sunday, 'as punishment.' The cell is the most indecent that exists in the whole jail; there is no light, and it is full of lice and vermin, the toilets are not in working order ... Rheumatism is making us all ill, no one can eat the food. We would like the [Prisoners' Advocate Committee] to circulate a petition demanding that we be let out of the cell we are in. All workshops should send a complaint to eh mayor or the warden making this request"

As a result, cigar workers at several factories went on strike in support of the prisoners. This, among other public disturbances, threatened the owners of the factories and prompted them to accuse the Lectors of reading Communist propaganda.

According to the Tampa Daily Times: "Originally the practice was a beneficial and instructive one, the readers sitting all day in the factories and reading aloud newspapers, novels and instructive works. The result was that the Tampa cigar maker was probably better posted on current events than the average American workman in any other industry. But in recent months the readers have turned to the reading of red-hot radical publications and anarchistic propaganda, with the result that widespread unrest developed among the cigar workers".

=== Banning of the Lector ===
So, on November 26, 1931, the factory owners officially banned what they thought was their biggest enemy – The Lector – clearly dictated in this publication: "in the past, manufacturers had entered into an agreement with workers, allowing the reading of educational or instructional information, articles, or books, but the abuse of this privilege, and starting this morning, reading aloud is eliminated…the manufacturers will not allow readers to read anything in the factories, and no collection will be permitted in the factories".

November 28, 1931
- Strike protest meeting at Labor Temple

So the initiation of the strike was twofold – strikers were outraged at the treatment their fellow workers were receiving in jail and they were further propelled to strike when the next morning they found the platforms for the Lectors demolished. This created a brief, 3-day strike. A headline of the New York Times on November 30, 1931, read Tampa Cigar Makers to End Strike where:

"Cigar makers who called a three day strike Friday in behalf of seventeen communist sympathizers in jail here announced today that they would return to work tomorrow. Heads of the cigar factories said Friday, however, that the men are no longer connected with their plants. They made no further statement today."

Then, on December 4, 1931, the Wall Street Journal published an article titled "Cigar Strike Becomes Lockout" wherein: "A cigar makers' 72 hour strike precipitated by dismissal of 'readers' (men who read to the workers as they roll tobacco) developed into a 'lockout.' The workers completed their strike and reported for work Monday, but the manufacturers refused to take them back. In retaliation the strikers threatened to refuse to return when they are called back. Such a shortage of skilled labor might conceivably result in higher cigar prices".

The reason that manufacturers performed this lockout is that the necessary orders for the Christmas shipment had been filled and they felt it necessary to push back against the radical labor movement they found themselves a part of. And so the strike continued, most readily characterized as a raid against supposed communist leaders who were thought to be the ones inciting the worker rebellions. Tampa citizens formed a "secret committee of 25 outstanding citizens" who, according to the Tampa Tribune, "had the sole purpose of driving out the communists, whether they are communists freshly arrived or long here".

On December 10, 1931, the New York Times published an article that addressed this ongoing public battle of citizen vigilante committees versus supposed communist leaders. In it, Harris G. Sims outlined the vices of the workers and how the city is trying to squash the movement. "While strike leaders denied that Red propagandists inspired them," the article says that when "police raided the headquarters of an industrial union a Soviet flag and a large quantity of Red literature were found and seized".

The strike escalated to the point where more than "twenty automobiles manned by policemen with riot guns were ready to quell a disturbance [that failed to arise]." Then, Federal Judge Alexander Akerman:

"signed an injunction against more than 140 persons believed to be leaders of the outbreak ... the injunction was drastic and sweeping. It probably hit the heart of the radical program with a clause restraining those named 'from continuing to maintain and conduct the organization known as The Tobacco Workers Industrial Union of Tampa as an organization under the statement of principles advocating and encouraging the belief in the destruction by force of organized government or in the destruction of private property as a means to that end'"

As such, the fight among workers for their Lectors was played off by local and federal government as a communist movement that aimed at undermining the integrity of the United States. And while the workers, for many years, had been a part of social groups that encouraged this sort of talk, their ideological differences were magnified, ridiculed and preyed upon by adversaries to misconstrue them as their main intent in the strike. It left them no legal leg to stand on and heavily contributed to them losing the strike.

On December 10, 1931, Ybor Cigar workers voted to return to work during a mass meeting of 1500 workers at the Labor Temple.

On December 15, 1931, the Wall Street Journal published an article titled, Tampa's cigar makers' strike ended when most of the 8,000 who walked out nearly three weeks ago after their "readers" were discharged, returned to work. The Lectors were never again reinstated in cigar makers' factories. Re-hiring was not automatic as "the strikers are no longer employees" but the original wage scales prevailed.

== Outside Commentary ==
In contemporary reporting on the 1931 strike, The Daily Worker, a left-leaning labor newspaper, highlighted both the strengths and limitations of the movement. Journalist N. Sparks observed that Spanish-speaking workers, influenced by long-standing political activism in Latin American labor movements, were highly organized and politically conscious during the strike.

However, the newspaper also criticized the strike leadership for failing to expand participation beyond Latino workers, noting that the movement had "not yet drawn in the Native American Workers..." which limited its broader effectiveness. This outside perspective reflects how observers at the time recognized the strong solidarity within Ybor City's immigrant communities while also acknowledging the challenges of building cross-racial labor alliances in Tampa during the early 20th century.

== Historical significance ==
The Strike of 1931 is remembered as the final battle in which a tradition integral to cigar makers' craft had for once and for all been removed by the growing corporate power in the United States. Moreover, the rights of minorities to engage in free speech and express their political opinions were overwhelmingly disregarded by an establishment feeling threatened by radical ideologies. Despite a traditional "loss," the manner in which workers held together showed the power of people in the face of local, state and federal government. Two years later on December 28, 1933, cigar makers and manufacturers came to an agreement of sorts in which, according to the Wall Street Journal, "A pact was signed by cigar manufacturers and workers banning lockout and strikes for three years. A wage scale agreement is awaiting adoption of a code for the industry".

The strike also demonstrated the strength and cohesion of Tampa's Latino immigrant community. According to The Daily Worker (1931), the strike's organization reflected strong support among Latino workers, even as the paper critiqued the lack of broader inclusion of Black and white workers. The newspaper highlighted that while the strike was used to promote the Communist Party, it also documented the solidarity and collective effort of the predominantly Latino workforce, showing how tightly knit community networks bolstered labor activism.
