= Lector (cigar manufacture) =

Occupation

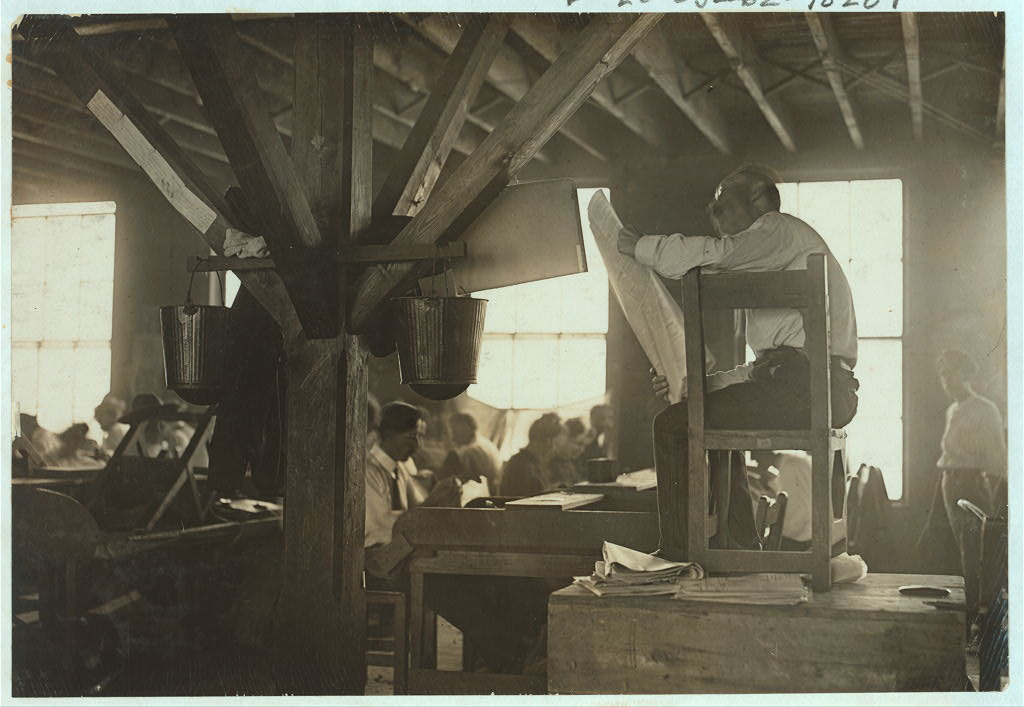
A lector reader, Tampa January 1909

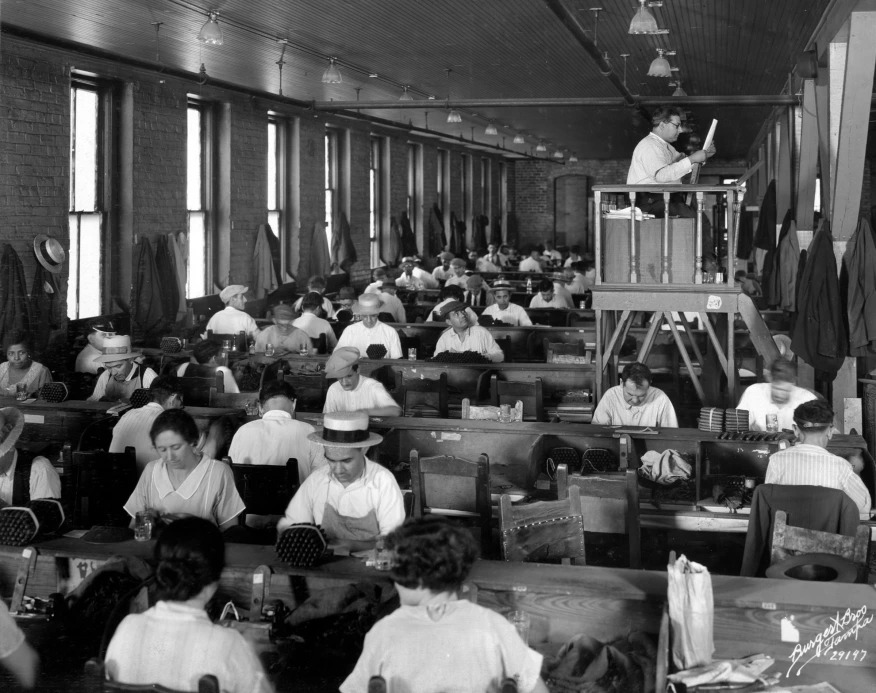
Lector reading at Cuesta-Rey Cigar Company in Tampa, 1929

In cigar manufacture, a lector or reader is an employee hired by fellow workers to entertain them by reading books or newspapers aloud.

The practice began in Cuba, in 1865, to relieve workers' boredom. The custom also spread to areas with Cuban influence, such as Ybor City, Tampa, Florida.

In practice, lectors often read left-wing publications, and often took on extra-official roles and formerly acted as "spurs to dissent", becoming a part of union advocacy. In the United States, the lector tradition ended in the aftermath of the Ybor City cigar makers' strike of 1931. The lector tradition still continues in Cuba, however, and as of 2017, UNESCO was considering designating the profession a form of "intangible cultural heritage".

== See also ==
- Luisa Capetillo
- List of obsolete occupations
