= Cuesta-Rey =

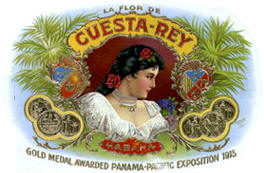

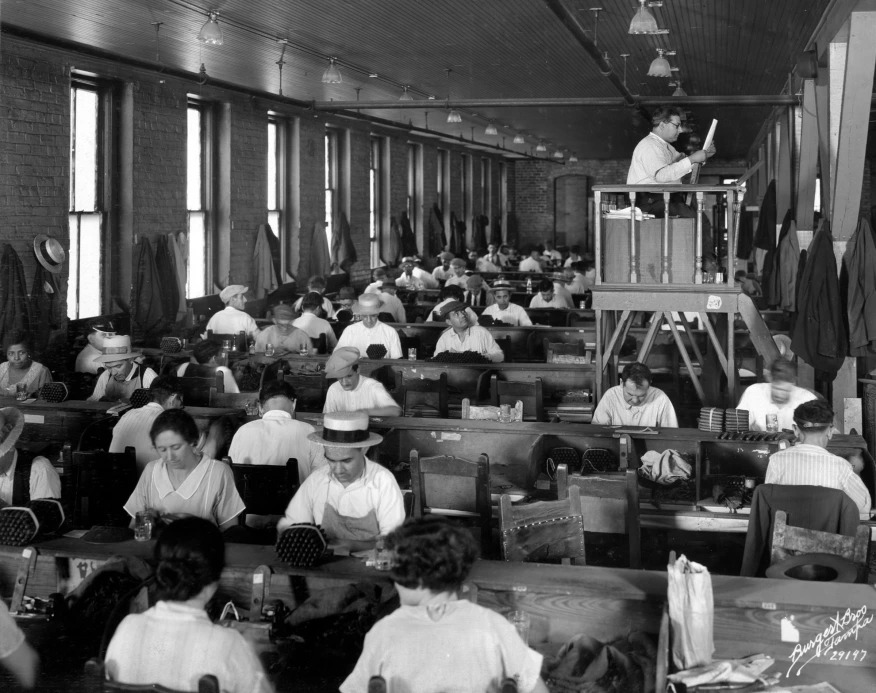
Lector reading at Cuesta-Rey Cigar Company in Tampa, 1929

Cuesta-Rey (originally 'La flor de Cuesta-Rey' and still printed on the box) is a brand of handmade cigar, founded in 1884 by Angel LaMadrid Cuesta and Peregrino Rey. Cuesta, a Spaniard, had apprenticed in cigar making in Cuba before he met Rey. They formed the company in the Ybor City district of Tampa, Florida to make 'clear Havana' cigars (cigars made in the United States using imported Cuban tobacco). As well as making their own brands they made cigars for other companies such as Nat Sherman.

In 1958, Karl Cuesta, Angel's son sold the company to the J.C. Newman Cigar Co. and since the 1980s they have been produced in the Dominican Republic by Tabacalera A. Fuente.

== Current brands ==
- Cabinet Selection
- Centenario Coleccion
- Centro Fino Sungrown
