= Virginia Sánchez Korrol =

American historian

- Known for: Historian of Puerto Rican Community in New York

Virginia Sánchez Korrol is an American historian and foundational figure in the field of Puerto Rican studies. She is a professor emerita at Brooklyn College and CUNY.

Throughout her career, Sánchez Korrol has also worked with the Museum of the City of New York, the Brooklyn's Hispanic Communities Oral History Project, and as one of three U.S. scholars on the international program committee of the Fifth International Congress on Hispanic Cultures in the United States, which was held in Madrid, Spain, in 1992. She consulted on the 2021 West Side Story adaptation by director Steven Spielberg and, in conjunction with María Pérez y González, created "West Side Story: The Brooklyn Connection," an online lecture series featuring appearances by Steven Spielberg, Tony Kushner, and others.

== Virginia Sánchez Korrol Dissertation Award ==
In 2018, the Puerto Rican Studies Association (PRSA) named the PRSA dissertation award, an award meant to recognize and honor the most notable Ph.D. dissertation produced in Puerto Rican Studies, for Virginia Sánchez Korrol. Winners are chosen every two years.

=== Past Winners ===
2022: Sara C. Awartani, "Solidarities of Liberation, Visions of Empire: Puerto Rico, Palestine, and the U.S. Imperial Project, 1967-1999"

- Honorable Mention: Sarah Bruno, "Black Latinx Dexterity: Emotions in Bomba Puertorriqueña and Decolonizing Diasporic Archives"
- Honorable Mention: Sarah Molinari, "Reimagining Recovery: Debt, Mutual Aid, and Disaster Governance in Puerto Rico"

2020: Julie Torres, "In Times of Crisis: Puerto Rican Activism, Gender and Belonging in Orlando"

- Honorable Mention: Laura Janet Kaplan, "P.S. 25, South Bronx: Bilingual Education and Community Control"

2018: Cristina Pérez Jiménez:, "'Here to Stay': New York Puerto Ricans and the Consolidation of Latino New York, 1931-1951"

2016: Alessandra M. Rosa, "Resistance Performances: (Re)constructing Spaces of Resistance and Contention in the 2010-2011 University of Puerto Rico Student Movement"

2014: Peter Carlo Becerra, "Which is 'white' and which 'colored'?: Notes on race and/or color among Puerto Ricans in interwar New York City"

2012: Marilisa Jimenez, "'Every child is born a poet': The Puerto Rican narrative within American children's culture"

2010: Radost Rangelova, "House, Factory, Beauty Salon, Brothel: Space, Gender and Sexuality in Puerto Rican Literature and Film"

== Selected publications ==
- From Colonia to Community: The History of Puerto Ricans in New York City (1983)
