= Vicki L. Ruiz =

American historian (born 1955)

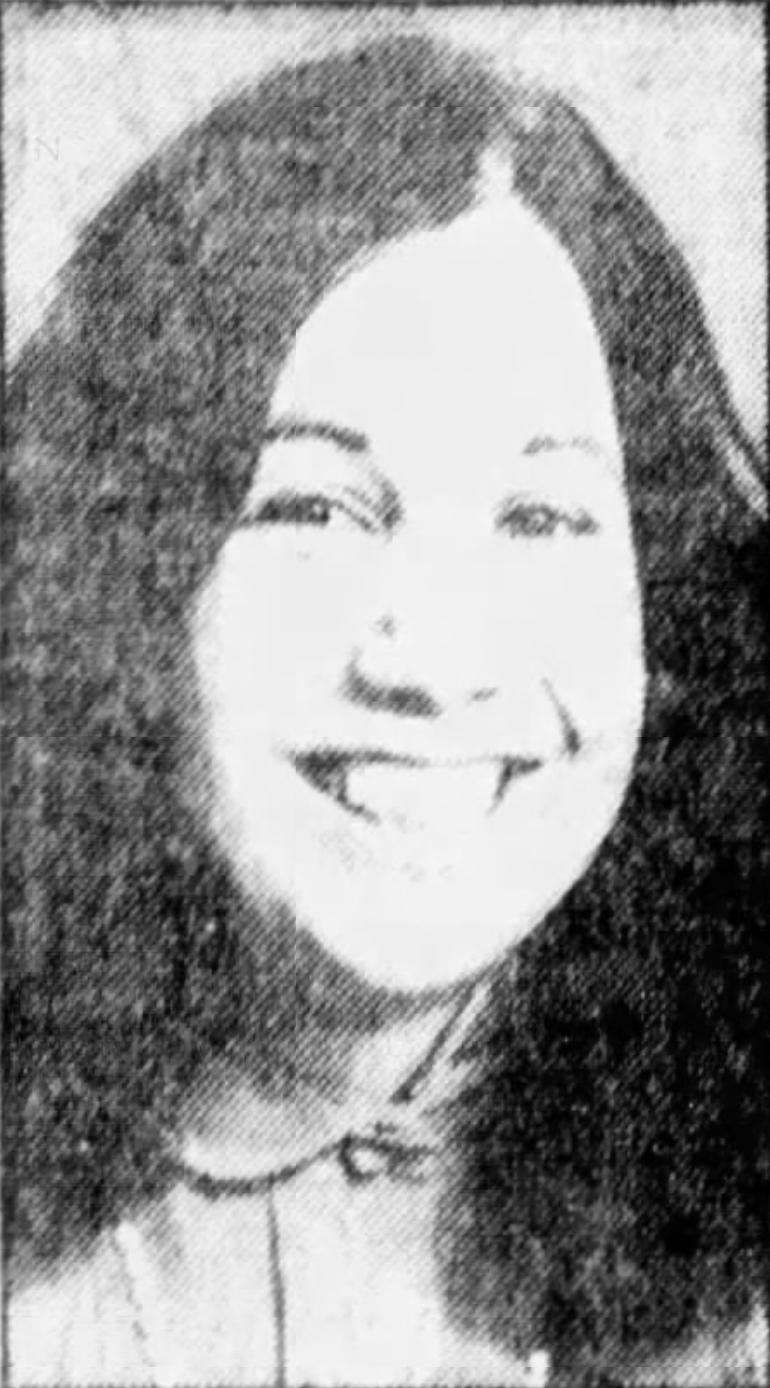
- Ruiz in 1983
- Born: May 21, 1955 (age 71); Atlanta, Georgia, U.S.
- Education: Florida State University; Stanford University (PhD)
- Occupation: Historian
- Spouse(s): Jerry Ruiz (m. 1979–1990) Victor Becerra (m. 1992)
- Children: 2

Vicki Lynn Ruiz (born May 21, 1955) is an American historian who has written or edited 14 books and published over 60 essays. Her work focuses on Mexican-American women in the twentieth century. She is a recipient of the National Humanities Medal.

== Personal life ==
Ruiz was born on May 21, 1955, to Erminia Pablita Ruiz Mercer and Robert Mercer in Atlanta, Georgia. She grew up in Florida where she attended public schools that were still in the process of desegregating. Because her father owned a small sport fishing business, her early years were spent moving up and down the coast, following seasonal work, and attending two or more schools a year. It was in the eighth grade that the family settled down in Florida (due to the insistence of her mother). Throughout her childhood she was strongly influenced by stories and histories told to her by her mother and by her grandmother, Maria de la Nieves Moya.

As an adult, Ruiz has lived and worked in Texas, California, and Arizona, and currently lives in California again. She was married to Jerry Ruiz from 1979 to 1990, and they have two sons, Miguel and Daniel. In 1992, Ruiz married Victor Becerra.

== Education ==
Ruiz is a first-generation college student. She attended Gulf Coast Community College and went on to earn her undergraduate degree from Florida State University. It was there that she studied with sociologist Leanor Boulin Johnson, who introduced her to scholarship in Chicano studies. It was also at Florida State University that she met Dr. Jean Gould Bryant, who encouraged her to apply to graduate school. Ruiz graduated Florida State in 1977, then went on to graduate studies at Stanford University where she worked with professors Albert Camarillo and Estelle Freedman. Camarillo introduced Ruiz to the study of women's cannery unions in California and the labor activism of Luisa Moreno, an important role model for Ruiz. She completed her PhD in history from Stanford University in 1982.

== Career ==
Ruiz's first book was about Mexican-American female cannery workers in California from 1939–1950. Her research emphasized the importance of kinship networks for securing employment, providing support against racism, and generating political and labor activism. Her later work expanded to include more general history of Mexican-American women in the twentieth century. A prolific historian, Ruiz is author of two widely read monographs and over 60 historical essays and articles. She recently worked as a professor of history and Chicano/Latino studies at the University of California, Irvine, and was named a scholar-in-residence at Los Angeles' Occidental College for the 2018–2019 academic year.

Ruiz has served as president of the American Historical Association (AHA), the American Studies Association (ASA), the Berkshire Conference of Women Historians, the Organization of American Historians (OAH), and the Pacific Coast Branch of the AHA.

In 2015 she was inducted into the American Academy of Arts and Sciences. That same year she was awarded the National Humanities Medal by President Barack Obama. The National Humanities Medal "honors an individual or organization whose work has deepened the nation's understanding of the human experience, broadened citizens' engagement with history and literature or helped preserve and expand Americans' access to cultural resources."

== Selected publications ==
- Latina Lives, Latina Narratives: Influential Essays by Vicki L. Ruiz edited by Miroslava Chávez-Garcia
- From Out of the Shadows: Mexican Women in Twentieth-Century America
- Cannery Women, Cannery Lives: Mexican Women, Unionization, and the California Food Processing Industry, 1930–1950
- Unequal Sisters: A Multicultural Reader in U. S. Women's History
- Latina Legacies: Identity, Biography, and Community
- Las Obreras: Chicana Politics of Work and Family
- Memories and Migrations: Mapping Boricua and Chicana Histories
- Latinas in the United States, Set: A Historical Encyclopedia
