= Nancy A. Hewitt =

American historian (born 1951)

Nancy A. Hewitt (born 1951) is an American academic. She is a professor emerita at Rutgers University, winner of the Guggenheim Fellowship, and an expert on gender history and feminism.

== Career ==
After receiving a bachelors' degree at the State University of New York, Brockport, she obtained her PhD from the University of Pennsylvania. From 1996 to 1997, she was a fellow at the Center for Advanced Studies in Stanford. Professor Hewitt was Pitt Professor of American History and Institutions at the University of Cambridge in 2009-2010. She also taught at the University of South Florida and Duke University.

== Research ==
Hewitt's research focuses on American women's history, nineteenth century U.S. history, women's activism and feminism in comparative perspective. She has published and edited several books. Her work has been cited in the press including in Slate, The Conversation and there is an interview of her on History Matters.

== Selected bibliography ==
- Hewitt, Nancy A. (1984). Women's Activism and Social Change: Rochester, New York, 1822–1872. Cornell University Press. ISBN 978-1-5017-2175-5.
- Hewitt, Nancy A. (2001). Southern Discomfort: Women's Activism in Tampa, Florida, 1880s-1920s. University of Illinois Press. ISBN 978-0-252-02682-9.
- Hewitt, Nancy A. (2010). No Permanent Waves: Recasting Histories of U.S. Feminism. Rutgers University Press. ISBN 978-0-8135-4724-4.
- Hewitt, Nancy A. (2018). Radical Friend: Amy Kirby Post and Her Activist World. University of North Carolina Press. ISBN 978-1469640327.
