= List of cigar brands =

This is an alphabetical list of cigar brands. Included is information about the company owning the brand name as well as a column allowing easy viewing of the source of that information.

If a brand name begins with the English word "The" or its Spanish equivalents, El, La, Los, and Las, that first word is disregarded. Brands denoted by dual personal names or by personal names preceded by the title, Don, are alphabetized by the first name of the series — thus "Don Pepín Garcia" appears under the letter D, not G. Brand names beginning with De or Del are listed under D.

Brand name	Manufacturer	Notes	Source
57	ITC		
777	Tabacos S.A.	Honduras, Nicaragua	
1881	Tabacalera Incorporada	Created in 1981 to celebrate the company's centennial. Philippine, Brazilian and Indonesian tobacco.	
5 Vegas	Cigars International	1990s brand now wholly owned; various manufacturers	
898 Collection	Owned by Mike's Cigars	Wholly owned; various manufacturers	
1881 Perique	Tabacalera Incorporada	Marketed as a different blend of the 1881 cigar, using 15-year-old Brazilian and Philippine tobacco, as well as Louisiana Perique tobacco.	
AJ Fernandez	AJ Fernandez Incorporated	Nicaragua	
Adan y Eva	Cuban Desire Corporation (Carlos Fleitas)		
Alec Bradley	Alec Bradley	Contracts with various factories for manufacture.	
Alhambra	Tabacalera Incorporada	Founded in 1912. Once a competing brand to Tabacalera, later purchased by the company in the 1970s. Philippine and Indonesian tobacco.	
American Rebel	Stogiebird		
Aristoff			
Arsen	Corporacion Cigar Export	Dominican Republic	
Arturo Fuente	Arturo Fuente	Dominican Republic	
Ashton	Arturo Fuente	Philadelphia, Pennsylvania	
AVO	Davidoff	Dominican Republic	
Baccarat	Davidoff	Imperial Tobacco Dominican Republic	
Backwoods Smokes			
Bahman	ITC		
Ben-Hur Cigars	Wm. Tegge & Co.	Detroit, Michigan	
Black & Mild			
Blackbird Cigar Co.		Dominican Republic	
Bolívar	1. Habanos S.A.; 2. General Cigar Co.	Dueling Cuban and non-Cuban brands; non-Cuban made in the Dominican Republic	
Bongani	Bongani Cigars; distributed by Boutique Stogies Ltd in the USA	The first fully-African cigar brand, made in Mozambique using African tobacco. "Bongani" means "Be Grateful" in the Zulu language.	
Cabaiguan	owned by Tatuaje Cigars, Inc.	in consultation with Jaime Garcia, the son of José "Pepin" Garcia	
Cain	Oliva Cigar Co.	handcrafted by the Oliva Cigar Company in Nicaragua	
Camacho	Oettinger Davidoff Group	Honduras	
Carlos Toraño	General Cigar Company	Dominican Republic	
Chaman	Vegas de Santiago	Costa Rica	
Cigar Jesus	Cigar Jesus	Nicaragua	
Cohiba	1. Habanos S.A.; 2. General Cigar Company	Dueling Cuban and non-Cuban brands; non-Cuban made in the Dominican Republic	
El Credito - Altadis	General Cigar		
Cuaba		Briones Montoto (Romeo y Julieta) factory in Havana Cuba	
Cuesta-Rey	J.C. Newman	El Reloj Factory	
Dannemann	The German Dannemann GmbH and the Swiss company Burger Söhne shared the rights	Machine-made in Germany	
Davidoff	Davidoff	Imperial Tobacco	
Diamond Crown	J.C. Newman	Dominican Republic	
Diesel	A. J. Fernandez Cigars	Previously exclusive to Cigars International	
Diplomáticos		Cuba	
Djarum	Djarum	Indonesia	
Djarum Black	Djarum	Kretek-filled filter cigar sold in the United States	
Don Alfredo	Dunhill		
Don Cándido	Dunhill		
Don Diego	Altadis	Dominican Republic	
Don Juan Urquijo	Tabacalera Incorporada	A blend of Philippine, Brazilian, Connecticut, and Nicaraguan tobacco.	
Don Pepin Garcia		Tabacalera Nicaragua (Esteli)	
Don Tomas	Estelo Padron	Danli, Honduras	
Dunhill			
Dutch Masters	Altadis	Introduced in 1912	
DUX	Altadis		
East Coast Rollers	Famous Smoke Shop	Exclusive to online store	
El Sol Cigars	El Sol Cigars	The 2nd oldest cigar manufacturer in Ybor City, Florida	El Sol began US production and sales in 1928
Ernesto Perez-Carrillo	Perez-Carrillo Tabacalera La Alianza S.A.	Dominican Republic (E.P. Carillo)	
Familija Cigars		Australian-owned and curates premium blends	
Farvardin	Iranian Tobacco Company		
Flor De Las Antillas	Don Pepin Garcia		
La Flor de la Isabela	Tabacalera Incorporada	Currently known as Tabacalera. Made in the Philippines	
Flor del Punto	Dunhill		
Flor de Selva	Maya Selva	Honduras	
La Flor Dominicana	La Flor Dominicana	Dominican Republic	
Fonseca	1. Habanos S.A.; 2. MATASA	Dueling Cuban and non-Cuban brands; non-Cuban made in the Dominican Republic	
Fuente	Tabacalera Fuente	Dominican Republic	
Fuente Fuente Opus X	Arturo Fuente	Made by Tabacalera A. Fuente	
Fumadores		premium cigar blended and made by José "Pepin" García	
Game	Swedish Match		
Garcia Y Vega	Swedish Match		
Gispert	1. Habanos S.A.; 2. Altadis	Former Cuban cigar now produced in Honduras	
La Gloria Cubana	1. Habanos S.A.; 2. General Cigar Company	Dueling Cuban and non-Cuban brands; non-Cuban made in the Dominican Republic	
The Griffins	Davidoff	Imperial Tobacco Dominican Republic	
Guantanamera			
H. Upmann	1. Habanos S.A.; 2. Altadis	Cuban, and non-Cuban produced in the Dominican Republic	
Hamlet (cigar)	Gallaher Group division of Japan Tobacco	Hamlet cigars were first launched in the UK in 1964	
Havana Soul			
Helix	General Cigar Co.		
Henry Clay	Altadis	Dominican Republic	
Hestia Tobacco			
HOMA	ITC		
Hoyo de Monterrey	1. Habanos S.A.; 2. General Cigar Company	Dueling Cuban and non-Cuban brands; non-Cuban made in Honduras	
HPC	1. Honduras Premium Cigars; 2. Réza BEY-BRAHIM	Exclusively made with Honduran tobaccos; non-Cuban made in Honduras	
Indian Tabac	Rocky Patel		
J.R. Tobacco	Altadis		
Joya de Nicaragua	Joya de Nicaragua	Nicaragua	
Juan López			
King Edward the Seventh	Swisher International	Jacksonville, Florida	
Lars Tetens	Lars Tetens	US, Dominican Republic, Mexico	
Loeser & Wolff			
Macanudo	General Cigar Company	Dominican Republic	
Maker's Mark			
Marsh Wheeling	National Cigar Corp.	"stogies"	
Maximus	J.C. Newman		
Maxum			
Montesino	Arturo Fuente	Dominican Republic	
Montecristo	1. Habanos S.A.; 2. Altadis	Cuban, and non-Cuban produced in the Dominican Republic	
Morro Castle	A. J. Fernandez Cigars	Exclusive to Cigars International	
My Father	My Father - Jose Don Pepin Garcia	Esteli, Nicaragua	
Nat Sherman	Nat Sherman	Has used various makers over time	
Nicoya Cigars	Nicoya Cigars	Australia's only cigar company, founded in 2015 by Gerard Hayes.	
Nub	Oliva Cigar Co.	Nicaragua	
Old Henry			
Oliva		J. Cortès Cigars N.V., a private, family-owned business based in Zwevegem, Belgium (2016)	
Oliveros		Dominican Republic	
Pacemaker	Waitt & Bond	Newark, NJ	
Padilla	Padilla		
Padrón		Nicaragua	
La Palina	Made by PDR Dominican Republic for La Palina	Dominican Republic	
Partagás	1. Habanos S.A.; 2. General Cigar Company	Dueling Cuban and non-Cuban brands; non Cuban made in the Dominican Republic	
Paul Garmirian	Davidoff		
La Paz	Swedish Match		
Perdomo	Tabacalera Perdomo		
Phillies			
Piloto Cigars Inc.	Privately held company that produces the Padrón cigar brand from Nicaragua		
Plasencia	Nestor Plasencia	Nicaragua	
Playboy	Altadis		
Por Larrañaga	Altadis		
PROPIO	Achievement Cigar Company Inc	Ecuadoran Vintage and Cuban Vintage Tobacco	
Punch	1. Habanos S.A.; 2. General Cigar Company	Dueling Cuban and non-Cuban brands; non-Cuban made in Honduras	
Quai d'Orsay			
Quesada	Matasa	Dominican Republic	
Quintero			
Ramón Allones		Cuba	
El Rey del Mundo			
El Rico Habano	General Cigar Company		
Ritmeester	Dannemann Cigars	Founded in 1887 in Veenendaal, Netherlands	
Rocky Patel	Rocky Patel		
Romeo y Julieta	1. Habanos S.A.; 2. Altadis	Cuban, and non-Cuban produced in the Dominican Republic	
Royal Dutch Cigars	Ritmeester		
Royal Jamaican	Altadis		
Saint Luis Rey (cigar)	Altadis		
San Bosco			
San Cristóbal de la Habana			
San Lotano	A. J. Fernandez Cigars		
San Miguel	A. J. Fernandez Cigars	Exclusive to Cigars International, Nicaragua	
Sancho Panza	General Cigar Co.		
Sancti Spiritus (cigar)		José "Pepin" Garcia and is manufactured at the El Rey de los Habanos factory in the Little Havana section of Miami, Florida	
Siglo	Altadis		
Star Cigar		manufactured in the Dominican Republic	
Swag	Boutique Blends Cigars	Dominican Republic	
Swisher		Dominican Republic (Non premium cigar)	
Tabacalera	Tabacalera Incorporada	Flagship brand of Tabacalera Incorporada. Formerly known as La Flor de la Isabela. Philippine and Indonesian tobacco	
Tatuaje	Pete Johnson	Nicaragua	
The Burndown Podcast	Blackbird Cigar Co.	Available at Flying Cigar Co.	
Tierra del Sol	Tabacalera Perdomo		
Tiparillo	SMCI HOLDING, INC		
TIR	ITC		
Toraño	Toraño Cigars purchased by General Cigar Co.		
Toscano	Manifatture Sigaro Toscano	Original full-length Italian cigars	
Trinidad	1. Habanos S.A.; 2. Altadis	Cuban, and non-Cuban produced in the Dominican Republic	
T4	ITC		
Vamma Del Sol	Konstantinedes Bros	Founded in 2011 in Krya Vrisi Pella Greece	
Vegafina	Altadis	Dominican Republic	
Vegas Robaina			
Vegueros	Habanos S.A.	Cuba	
Villa Zamorano	Maya Selva	Honduras	
White Owl			
Willem II	Swedish Match	Founded in 1916 in Valkenswaard, Netherlands	
Windsor	San Andres Southern Tobacco Co.	Mexico	
Wolf & Eagles	Surobakku Group	Indonesia	
Zar	ITC		
Zino	Davidoff	Dominican Republic	
Zica	ITC		

== See also ==
- List of cigarette brands
