= Boutique Blends Cigars =

American cigar manufacturer

Three torpedoes produced by Boutique Blends Cigars: the Oliveros Sun Grown Reserve, King Havano Claro, and Oliveros Eight Zero.

Boutique Blends Cigars, formerly the Habana Cuba Cigar Company, is an American manufacturer of premium hand-rolled cigars based in Miami, Florida. The company was established in 1996 during the American cigar boom as the non-Cuban manufacturer of the historic Cuban "Oliveros" brand. The company was sold in 2002 to a new ownership group consisting of the Cuban-born Rafael Nodal (born 1964), his wife Alina Cordoves Nodal, and Hank Bischoff.

In addition to products made under the Oliveros label, Boutique Blends is the maker of the brand names King Havano, Swag, and Aging Room. The name Boutique Blends was adopted as a new name for the company in February 2012 as part of a general repositioning of the firm away from flavored cigars and towards a premium, small batch, unflavored product. In 2013, Boutique Brands' Aging Room Quattro F55 Concerto cigar was named the "No. 2 Cigar of the Year" by the influential glossy magazine Cigar Aficionado. In 2019, the handmade Aging Room Quattro Nicaragua Maestro, produced in collaboration with Tabacalera A.J. Fernandez, was named "No. 1 Cigar of the Year".

== Company history ==
=== Establishment ===
The Habana Cuba Cigar Company was established in 1996 in Miami Lakes, Florida, as the non-Cuban licensee of the historic Cuban brand Oliveros. The American cigar market was entering the 5th year of a massive cigar boom, marked by demand outstripping supply at the wholesale and retail levels and the launch of many new brands to capitalize on a very favorable manufacturing climate. Habana Cuba Cigar Company launched the Oliveros brand for the American market as a flavored cigar, contracting production from Milton Germosen in the Dominican Republic.

The timing of the company's launch was not propitious, however, as in 1997 the supply of premium cigars began to surpass demand as the cigar fad faded. Millions of unsold cigars began to accumulate in inventory and the cigar boom gave way to a protracted retrenchment of the market, or "bust." Hubana Cuba Cigar and Oliveros soldiered on in the difficult market, turning to sellers on the internet for its primary distribution. The main distributor of the company's product was a website operated by Rafael Nodal and Hank Bischoff which specialized in the sale of the creations of small brands based in the Miami area.

As its most important sellers Nodal and Bischoff were not long in becoming formal advisors to Habana Cuba Cigar Company. In 2002 the owners of the company decided to sell the Habana Cuba Cigar Company. Rafael Nodal and Hank Bischoff, together with Nodal's wife, Alina Cordoves Nodal, herself the Cuban-born daughter of a second-generation tobacco distributor, entered into partnership and purchased the firm.

=== New ownership and a new emphasis ===
At the time of the 2002 acquisition, the portfolio of Habana Cuba Cigar Co. consisted of flavored cigars, with a handful of unflavored products such as the Oliveros Classic and the Oliveros Gran Reserva. The company's new owners soon discontinued their retail website to better concentrate their efforts on building wholesale distribution of the Oliveros brand.

Over time it became clear that the brand's foray into manufacture of flavored cigars — a market dominated by inexpensive machine-made products produced by large tobacco corporations — was an unprofitable way forward and that a more likely path to profitability and growth lay in the production of premium handrolled cigars. The Habana Premier Selection, a new premium product called constructed from high-quality Nicaraguan tobacco and manufactured under contract by Perdomo, was introduced. This marked the first time that a brand not called "Oliveros" was produced by the company.

In 2005 another new brand typified by a thick ring gauge was launched, called XL for Men. Instead of marketing the fat cigars to a specialized subset of experienced smokers, the brand was launched as an item for a mass market. An inability to maintain consistent quality and taste was an ongoing issue for the company and the size of the product relative to the rest of the market in that year further marginalized the brand's appeal.

Rafael Nodal recalled the failed XL for Men effort in a 2014 interview:

"XL for Men was not a successful line.... [W]e did everything wrong.... We should have marketed it as a niche product. At the time, cigars rarely went to 60 ring [0.9375 inches in diameter]. Now, it's normal. We may have been ahead of our time with the ring gauges, but we didn't have the necessary knowledge to execute it properly."

A more successful new product followed, a line called Oliveros King Havano. The cigar, developed with the aid of esteemed Nicaraguan tobacco grower Nestor Plasencia, was a Nicaraguan puro and gained a following which enabled the production of 300,000 units — the most successful release for Oliveros to date. The line was released both through physical "brick-and-mortar" tobacco shops and through the mass marketing of the catalog trade, a decision later regarded by company founder Rafael Nodal as a mistake, since it ultimately undermined the perceived value of the line.

Habana Cuba Cigar Co. next moved further into the production of specialized, small batch production with the launch of its next product line, a brand called Swag. In contrast to the Nicaraguan-made King Havano, the company returned to the Dominican Republic for production of the new line, contracting manufacture to José "Jochi" Blanco and his Tabacalera La Palma. The spicy line made use of Cuban seed and was a puro — containing 100% Dominican leaf. The new line was well received by consumers and reinforced the company's decision to move from mass market to boutique premium production.

The company moved even deeper into small batch production in 2011 with the launch of its Aging Room brand, a line which made use of premium aged Dominican tobacco and which was produced in even more limited quantities than its Swag products.

=== Launch of Boutique Brands ===
In 2012 the company's repositioning as a maker of small batch, premium cigars was further solidified with adoption of a new name, Boutique Blends Cigars. The announcement of the new company name was made on February 21 at the Pro Cigar trade show and festival in Santiago, Dominican Republic.

Boutique Blends received a major boost in the cigar world that same year, when the company's Aging Room Small Batch M356, a spicy ligero-laced cigar, made the list of the Top 25 Cigars of 2011 in Cigar Aficionado magazine. This was followed two years later with an even greater triumph, when the Aging Room Small Batch F55 was named the No. 2 Cigar of the Year for 2013 by that same magazine.

=== Strategic Alliance with Altadis ===
On May 15, 2017, Boutique Blends announced it was entering into a strategic alliance with Altadis USA by which Altadis would now handle sales and distribution for Boutique Blends portfolio. As a part of that alliance, Rafael Nodal would also join the Altadis USA executive team handling quality and production innovation across the whole Altadis portfolio.

== Product lines ==
- Oliveros Flavors
- Oliveros Classic
- Oliveros Gran Reserva
- Oliveros Eight Zero (2007)
- Oliveros King Havano
- Oliveros Sun Grown Reserve
- XL for Men
- Swag
- Aging Room
- Kopi Luwak
- Vista de Cuba

== See also ==
- List of cigar brands
