= Tabacalera (disambiguation) =

Tabacalera may refer to:

== Places ==
- Tabacalera of Tarragona, former factory in Tarragona, Spain
- La Tabacalera de Lavapiés, cultural and social center in Madrid, Spain
- Tabacalera House, heritage house in San Fernando, Philippines
- Tabacalera, barangay in Pateros, Philippines
- Colonia Tabacalera, neighbourhood in Mexico City

== Companies ==
- A.J. Fernandez Cigars, cigar brand in Nicaragua, originally named Tabacalera Fernandez
- Arturo Fuente, a cigar brand in Florida, United States, also known as Tabacalera A. Fuente
- Oliva Cigar Co., cigar brand in Nicaragua, originally named Tabacalera Oliva Tabolisa
- Perdomo (cigar brand), cigar brand in Nicaragua, sold worldwide by the name Tabacalera Perdomo
- Tabacalera, a Spanish tobacco monopoly of 1636
- Tabacalera del Este, Paraguay's largest cigarette manufacturer
