= Alec Bradley =

Cigar brand

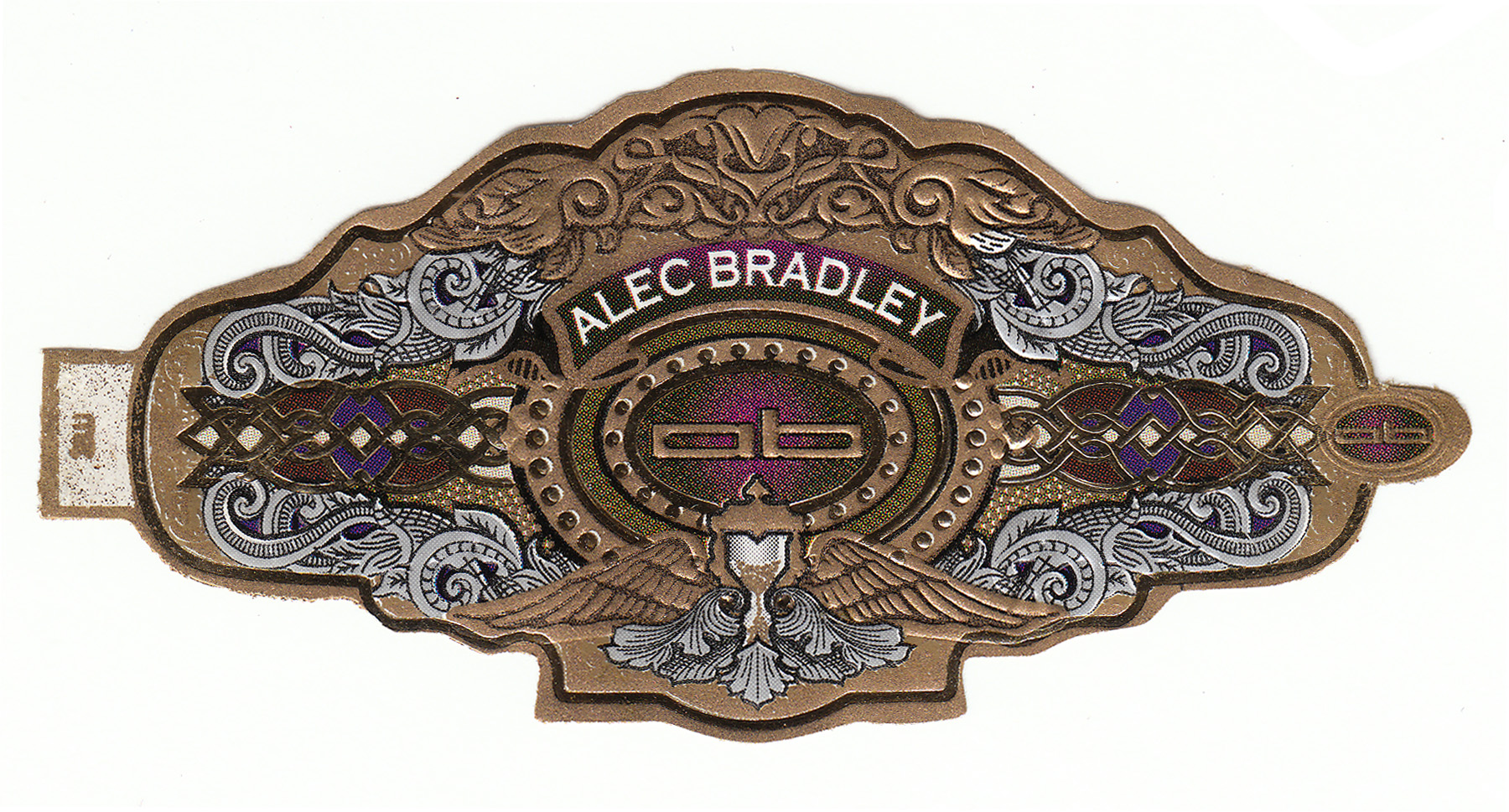
The original primary band from an Alec Bradley "Tempus" cigar. Now known as "Tempus Natural."

Alec Bradley is the name of a popular brand of handmade cigars established in 1996 by Alan Rubin, the son of an importer of hardware supplies. Rubin launched his brand, named after his children, at the tail end of the cigar boom of the 1990s and entered a clogged market. After failed initial schemes at producing cigars targeted to golf courses and flavored after-dinner cigars, Rubin managed to carve out a tenuous niche selling budget-priced cigars to tobacconists. In 2007 the company managed to break through to a broader market with the introduction of its full-flavored "Tempus" line. As of 2011 the company was selling between two and three million cigars annually to consumers around the world. Alec Bradley is today based in Hollywood, Florida. Over the years a number of manufacturers have been used to make Alec Bradley's various products, including Raices Cubanas of Honduras, Nestor Plasencia in Honduras and Nicaragua, and Henke Kelner in the Dominican Republic. In 2019 it became clear that the company had begun using J. Fuego Cigar Co. de Nicaragua factory in Estelí, Nicaragua as one of its mainstay manufacturers.

== Company History ==
=== Establishment ===
Alan Rubin (born circa 1961) is the son of a hardware importer who ran a Florida-based company called the All Points Screw Company, specializing in sales to manufacturers of cabinetry. Alan entered the business immediately after finishing college and helped the firm change its emphasis to the sale of hurricane fasteners, a booming business in the aftermath of Hurricane Andrew in 1992.

In 1996 the prosperous hardware concern was sold and Rubin used part of his proceeds from the sale to seriously launch the new cigar company he had envisioned and incorporated shortly before. The new company was named Alec Bradley after Rubin's children.

Rubin attended the 1996 Retail Tobacco Dealers of America trade show and eventually found a small manufacturer in Honduras who agreed to make cigars for him. Rubin later recalled the relationship was one-sided and costly. "It didn't work out very well," he said in a January 2011 interview with Cigar Aficionado magazine. "He was taking my money and not giving me product."

The first cigars by Alec Bradley were known as "Bogey's Stogies" and were designed to be sold through golf pro shops for golfers to smoke on the course. Manufactured from 1997 to 1999 — the deepest years of the "cigar bust" which followed the faddish cigar boom of the 1990s — Bogey's Stogies proved an unprofitable venture. By the spring of 1999, Rubin found himself approximately $60,000 in debt and facing failure of his venture.

=== The turnaround ===
In 2000, Rubin hooked up with cigar industry professional Ralph Montero, who came to work for Alec Bradley and was instrumental in shifting its direction. Rubin and Montero were convinced that they needed to gain space in the retail shops of specialty tobacco sellers and managed to scrape together enough money to launch a new product line called "Occidental Reserve," using Henke Kelner, a maker of cigars for the cigar brand Davidoff.

Some 500 sample packs of the new cigars were prepared and mailed out to retail shops, which were followed up with phone calls soliciting business. About 300 new customers were won for the company with this last-ditch gambit, according to Rubin.

The company followed up its low price Occidental Reserve line with a new triangular cigar called the "Trilogy." The unusual new cigar shape was both an attempt to lure consumers with a fresh-looking new product and an attempt to replicate the feel of a 46 ring cigar in the hand with a more weighty 50 ring product.

Rubin remembered:

"...I didn’t really love box-press or the semi-prensado, I didn’t really like that feel, so I went to Home Depot, and they happened to be demo-ing a DeWalt table saw, and I asked the guy, 'Does this thing cut angles?' he said, 'Yeah,' and I said, 'I’ll be right back.' I went out and I bought wood, I had him cut it on angles, and I bought some wood glue, and I made molds. I used a hand-vice that we had in the back of the office, and I started pressing cigars in a triangular shape.

"I made a V-shaped mold with an open top, and I used a flat top on it. That’s how we started to press them. When everyone would leave the office, I’d put two in there, and the next morning, I’d come in and take them out. It was hard to convince people here that it was what we should do, but once they started smoking it, they realized that it was really comfortable in their mouth and in their hand, and they embraced it."

Rubin followed up his triangular cigar in 2005 with another new line, this time a stout 50 ring gauge called "Maxx." Both of these new releases were well received in the industry, helping the struggling company to survive.

In 2007, Alec Bradley achieved its greatest success to date with the introduction of a new full-bodied line called "Tempus."

Rubin later recalled:

"Every cigar that we did prior to Tempus was mild, mild-to-medium, or medium. Tempus gave us a more full-bodied cigar, a little more strength, a high level of satisfaction in the flavor profile. It was really the next level of cigar for us. Alec Bradley became the [official] brand with Tempus. We felt the cigar warranted it."

The new Tempus line was produced by the Fabrica de Tabacos Raices Cubana factory of Danlí, Honduras, known for the manufacture of Cuban-style cigars with triple-capped heads. A special Trojes tobacco from the Jalapa Valley of Nicaragua was used for the product, which met with critical success from cigar connoisseurs.

=== #1 Cigar of the Year ===
The Alec Bradley Prensado won the 2011 #1 spot in Cigar Aficionado Magazine skyrocketing the company's brand into contention with other world-renowned cigars. Alan Rubin later recounted that this served as both a blessing and a bane to the company. The achievement helped grow the company at a rate it was not prepared for. The fame was shadowed by damage to the company reputation during two years of production issues. Alan on record was quoted:

"With Alec Bradley, even with those little bits of success, we were kind of flying under the radar, as a company. And then the first week in January of 2012 you're now firmly implanted in the center of the radar screen. People want to know who you are and what you're about."

"People were calling, friends that I had, and they would call and say ‘Give me 25 boxes of Prensado Churchill.' And the truth is if they called at the end of the day we were basically out of inventory. As soon as I said no they said ‘You're not the same company you used to be. I thought we were friends.' I'm never one to want to say no, I always want to say yes. I didn't want to say no. I overpromised. And I hurt a lot of people. And the truth is, we burdened the factory. In that one year we grew 72 percent. Unmanageable. And we put demands on the factory and we didn't have the processes in place."

"We had the processes in place for that amount of production. But you add another two million cigars into production overnight, whatever little thing goes wrong becomes a big thing."

"That was at the end of 2012. November, December of that year. At that point, you have a decision to make. Do I pull everything off and at some level almost go out of business? Or do I figure out how to work it out and manage it and do damage control? So I chose B. If someone calls with a complaint, we would send five cigars—but even then, the five cigars I was sending, I didn't know if those five cigars were right. So there weren't a lot of options, except to try to make things right. At one point we started rejecting shipments. We would be out of inventory, but we weren't going to put more bad cigars into the marketplace."

"It was getting better all along, but mid-2014 I was like, ‘We got it.' This is who we are, this is who we were. I turned to Ralph and I said, ‘We're back.' This is what these cigars are supposed to taste like."

=== Alec & Bradley ===
When Alan's oldest son Alec was through college and of age he began working full time for the company learning the ropes. Years later his brother Bradley would complete his college education and join him in the office full time as well. In 2018 the brothers announced they would begin blending cigars under the moniker "Alec & Bradley" as a spinoff from the company. The cigar marking their foray into the marketplace was titled "Blind Faith" and the entire project was done under their supervision and expenses. It was at first a limited product line and later became a core product in their portfolio. The following year they blended a collaboration with E.P. Carillo entitled "Gatekeeper." and returned to blending on their own with "Kintsugi" shipping in December 2020.

Though the Alec & Bradley lines are marketed and distributed by Alec Bradley they have often been noted as having a much different style of blending and branding that the portfolio of Alec Bradley. In addition the taking a different approach to blending and branding the sons have both contributed new ideas to the company. In early 2020, Alec Rubin announced the release of a project he has worked on with a handful of the company's Territory Managers. This project involved giving them creative control on a regional exclusive to be released in their own territories.

=== Controversy ===
In February 2014, the Ancient Order of Hibernians, the largest Irish organization in the U.S., protested the Alec Bradley product "Filthy Hooligan" which was a green cigar for sale leading up to St. Patrick's Day.

=== Sale of the Company ===
In February of 2023 it was announced that Scandinavian Tobacco Group would announce its agreement to acquire Alec Bradley Cigar Distributors for $72.5 million dollars. It now resides under their Forged Cigar Company sales portfolio.

== Cigar Portfolio ==
=== Current Lineup ===
==== Alec Bradley ====
- Occidental Reserve (1999–Present)
- Maxx (2005–Present)
- Tempus, now Tempus Natural (2009–Present)
- Prensado (from 2009) (Cigar of the Year, Cigar Aficionado 2011 )
- Spirit of Cuba (?-Present)
- American Classic (?-Present)
- American Sun Grown (?-Present)
- Black Market (2011–Present)
- Alec Bradley Connecticut (?-Present)
- Family Blend: The Lineage (2014–Present)
- Texas Lancero (2014–Present)
- Black Market Esteli (2017–Present)
- Prensado Lost Art (2017–Present)
- Magic Toast (2018–Present)
- Medalist (?-?, re-released 2018–Present)
- Project 40 (2019–Present)
- Caribbean Classic (2020–Present)
- Project 40 Maduro (2020–Present)
- Post Embargo Blend Code B-15 (2023-Present)
- Safe Keeping ( 2024-Present)
- Chunk Maduro (2024-Present)
- Chunk Shade (2025-Present)
- DND (2025-Present)

==== Alec & Bradley ====
- Gatekeeper (2019–Present)
- Kintsugi (2020–Present)

=== Limited Releases and Exclusives ===
==== Alec Bradley ====
- Black Market Filthy Hooligan (limited edition seasonal release)
- Black Market Filthy Hooligan Shamrock (limited edition seasonal release)
- Black Market Filthy Ghooligan (limited edition seasonal release)
- Fine & Rare (limited edition seasonal release)
- Nica Puro Diamond Rough Cut (limited edition)
- Black Market Illicit (2017–Present, TAA Exclusive)
- Black Market Esteli Diamond Rough Cut (limited edition, 2020)
- Corinthian Leather (limited edition US regional exclusive, 2020, 2021)
- Fashionably Late (limited edition US regional exclusive, 2020)
- Highway Child (limited edition US regional exclusive, 2020)
- Paper Tiger (limited edition US regional exclusive, 2020)
- Kinstugi Wabi Sabi (limited release)

==== Alec & Bradley ====
- Uru Doshi (Cigar Dojo limited edition community exclusive, 2020)

=== Archived Lineup ===
==== Alec Bradley ====
- Bogey's Stogies (1997–1999)
- Trilogy
- Maxx Brazil
- Maxx Connecticut
- Vice
- Select Cabinet Reserve (from 2009)
- Tempus Maduro (2009-2017)
- Family Blend (2009-2012)
- Harvest Selection 97'
- Raices Cubanas (2013-2017)
- Mundial (2013–2021)
- Coyol (2014–2025)
- Nica Puro (?-2021)
- Sanctum (2015-2017)
- Post Embargo (2015–2021)
- Tempus Nicaragua (2015–2025)
- Nica Puro Rosado (2015-2018)

==== Alec & Bradley ====
- Blind Faith (2018–2025)

== Accolades ==
=== Cigar Aficionado ===
- 2011: #1 Cigar of the Year - Prensado Churchill
- 2013: #24 Cigar of the Year - Prensado Robusto
- 2014: #16 Cigar of the Year - Mundial No. 5
- 2015: #15 Cigar of the Year - Sanctum Toro
- 2016: #18 Cigar of the Year - Coyol Petite Lancero
- 2017: #5 Cigar of the Year - Tempus Natural Centuria
- 2019: #24 Cigar of the Year - Project 40 6.52
- 2020: #7 Cigar of the Year - Gatekeeper Robusto
- 2022: #6 Cigar of the Year - Black Market Churchill
- 2023: #8 Cigar of the Year - Alec Bradley Prensado Torpedo

=== Cigar Journal ===
- 2014: Best Brand Honduras - Black Market
- 2015: #23 Cigar of the Year - Prensado Robusto
- 2016: Best Brand Honduras - Black Market
- 2016: Best Cigar Honduras - Sanctum Robusto
- 2017: Best Cigar Honduras - 2016 LE Fine & Rare
- 2018: Best Brand Honduras - Prensado Lost Art
- 2020: #24 Cigar of the Year - Project 40 6.52

== See also ==
- List of cigar brands
