= Robaina =

Surname

Robaina is a surname. Notable people with the surname include:

- Alejandro Robaina (1919–2010), Cuban tobacco grower
- Julio Robaina, the current mayor of Hialeah, Florida
- Julio Robaina (legislator), State Representative from the state of Florida
- Julio Robaina (state representative), State Representative from the state of Florida
- Rene Robaina (born 1965), founder, president, and CEO of Home Technology Solutions in Charlotte, NC
- Roberto Robaina (born 1956), the Foreign Minister of Cuba from 1993 until 1999

== See also ==
- Vegas Robaina, premium cigar brand, produced in Cuba
