= Quesada Cigars =

Dominican cigar factory

Quesada Cigars, formally known as MATASA, is a family-owned factory based in the Dominican Republic that specializes in the manufacture of premium cigars. It is best known brand is the Quesada, Casa Magna, Heisenberg & Fonseca line of cigars. Its current president and owner is Manuel "Manolo" Quesada, Jr.

== History ==
=== Quesada family ===
The Quesada family has been a part of the tobacco world for over a century. When they first arrived in Cuba from Spain they were bakers. It was in the late 1800s that they began their tobacco business when a debt to the family was paid with tobacco. Antero Gonzales and his brother Constantino started a leaf purchasing company, working as tobacco brokers.

At the beginning of the century the brothers split ways and established separate companies and became the two largest exporters of Cuban tobacco, from Cuba to international markets. They have been competing in the world market ever since through several generations.

A daughter of Antero Gonzalez married a man named Agustin Quesada, who worked his way up the ranks and ultimately took over the brokerage. These would be the parents of a boy named Manuel Quesada, who was in turn the father of Manuel Quesada, Jr. — the current head of MATASA.

In 1929, in searching for new and different tobaccos, the Quesada family arrived in the Dominican Republic for the first time. They discovered new tobacco strains there, which were sold profitably to European companies for the manufacture of cigars and cigarettes. While some of its tobacco continued to come from the Dominican Republic, the company remained based in Havana, Cuba.

=== Exile ===
The Cuban Revolution of 1960 forced the Quesada family into exile, with Manuel Sr. taking the family, including his 13-year-old son Manolo, to a new life in Santiago in the Dominican Republic. Here Manuel Quesada y Gonzalez bought warehouses and established a new tobacco brokerage in 1961, called Manipuladora de Tobaco. Manolo was sent to attend high school in Miami.

Following completion of his high school studies, Manolo went to work in the family business, where part of his job entailed smoking the various varieties of tobacco so as to better describe them to prospective customers. This led Manolo to become interested in the art of tobacco blending and the idea of becoming a manufacturer of cigars himself.

Manolo Quesada became close to a small scale customer of his family's, Juan Sosa, who worked as a cigar manufacturer in Miami, producing a brand called Antillian Cigars. Due to an aging population of experienced cigar-rollers (torcedores) and an increasingly unfavorable employment tax situation, the Sosa operation was joined with Quesada's brokerage, with Quesada handling manufacturing in the Dominican Republic while Sosa remained as the American distributor of the finished product.

=== Establishment of Manufactura de Tabacos S.A. ===
A new company was formed by Quesada to handle the manufacture of Antillian Cigars. This new firm, Manufactura de Tabacos, S.A. (commonly known by the acronym MATASA), was established in a new free trade zone in Santiago in June 1974. The company began as a small operation with "$100, a chair, and a phone," employing just three rollers. Soon there were 35 rollers producing the Fonseca and Sosa brands for Antillian. Total production in the first year was just 20,000 cigars.

MATASA soon underwent a period of expansion, taking over the production of the Ricardo Samuel line on behalf of a major cigar wholesaler of the day, Faber, Coe & Gregg. Additional rollers were hired and trained and within a few years MATASA was producing over 1 million cigars per year. In addition to the products it made for others under contract, the company launched its own brand, called José Benito.

Following the purchase of the non-Cuban version of the Romeo y Julieta brand by Hollco-Rohr, a contract was made with MATASA for production of the line in the Dominican Republic. The cash infusion associated with this expansion enabled MATASA to open its own box factory in 1978. In 1982, cigarmaker Santa Clara, Inc. contracted with MATASA for production of another 1 million cigars in its expanding Santiago operation. In 1984, a further contract was obtained for the production of the Licensiados brand.

MATASA continued a period of steady growth for the rest of the decade of the 1980s.

=== MATASA in the "Cigar Boom" ===
For a period of about five years beginning at the end of 1992 the United States experienced a sudden and massive growth in the popularity of premium cigars. The mad demand associated with this so-called "Cigar Boom" taxed available stocks of every necessary component and pushed production to the limit. New brands and manufacturing facilities sprung up overnight in attempt to capitalize on the faddish demand for cigars in America. Whereas prior to the boom there were approximately a dozen cigar factories in Santiago, near the end of the boom-and-bust cycle in 1997 there were more than 120.

While the demand for finished cigars immediately disposed of all production, Manolo Quesada remembers the period as a trying time:

"Everybody who came [to the manufacturing in the Dominican Republic] came to take from us. We lost everything — cellophane, boxes, tobacco, bands, everything. No one was geared to supply the vast amounts of product that was being demanded.... We told them, 'Take what you want...' We would just train more rollers, protect our farms better, [and] make box factories."

Prices for components skyrocketed, but MATASA carried on without dramatically increasing the price of its product. Ultimately, the Cigar Boom played itself out, with supply outstripping flagging demand and the vast majority of the fly-by-night cigarmakers who began in the early 1990s going out of business. MATASA was among those surviving the cigar bust of the late 1990s. The company suffered an additional hit towards the end of the 1990s when Romeo y Julieta ended its manufacturing relationship with the firm.

In 1998, Manolo Quesada's father, Manuel Senior, who had been running the company's leaf brokerage business, died. Faced with difficulty in competing with brokerages in other parts of the Caribbean, Central and South America, the wholesaling of tobacco leaf by MATASA's sibling company, Manipuladora de Tobaccos, was gradually curtailed. The company was particularly hindered by a 35% tax levied by the Dominican government upon exports.

=== The Early 2000s ===
Manolo Quesada assembled a new management team around him which included general manager Julio Fajardo, Manolo's brother Alvaro, who as vice president was in charge of the company's farms and fledgling cigarette operation, and his nephew Alvarito. Unfortunately, in April 2002 a plane crash took the lives of all three, leaving Manolo to run the company.

Today Manolo Quesada works with two daughters — Patricia and Raquel, niece Esther and nephew Hostos.

More than 300 people work in MATASA's Santiago manufacturing facility. The company produced approximately 15 million cigars in the year 2000.

The company's best selling brands are Casa Magna & Quesada Cigars, best known in the medium to full bodied segment and also Fonseca (non-Cuban version), a brand best known for products in the mild-to-medium segment of the taste spectrum.

=== The Company Today, now known as Quesada Cigars ===
Manuel Quesada opened up his Matasa facility in 1974 with a roller, a desk, and a telephone.

== Cigar lines ==
- Casa Magna
- Quesada Cigars
- Fonseca Cigars
- Heisenberg Cigars
- Cubita
- Regius

== See also ==
- List of cigar brands
