= Joya de Nicaragua =

- Industry: Tobacco industry
- Genre: Cigars
- Headquarters: Estelí, Nicaragua
- Products: Cigars

Joya de Nicaragua, S.A., established in 1968, is the oldest brand of cigars made in Nicaragua. The company continues to manufacture its products today from its headquarters in Estelí. Today it is a major manufacturing center of handmade cigars.

== Company history ==
=== Establishment ===
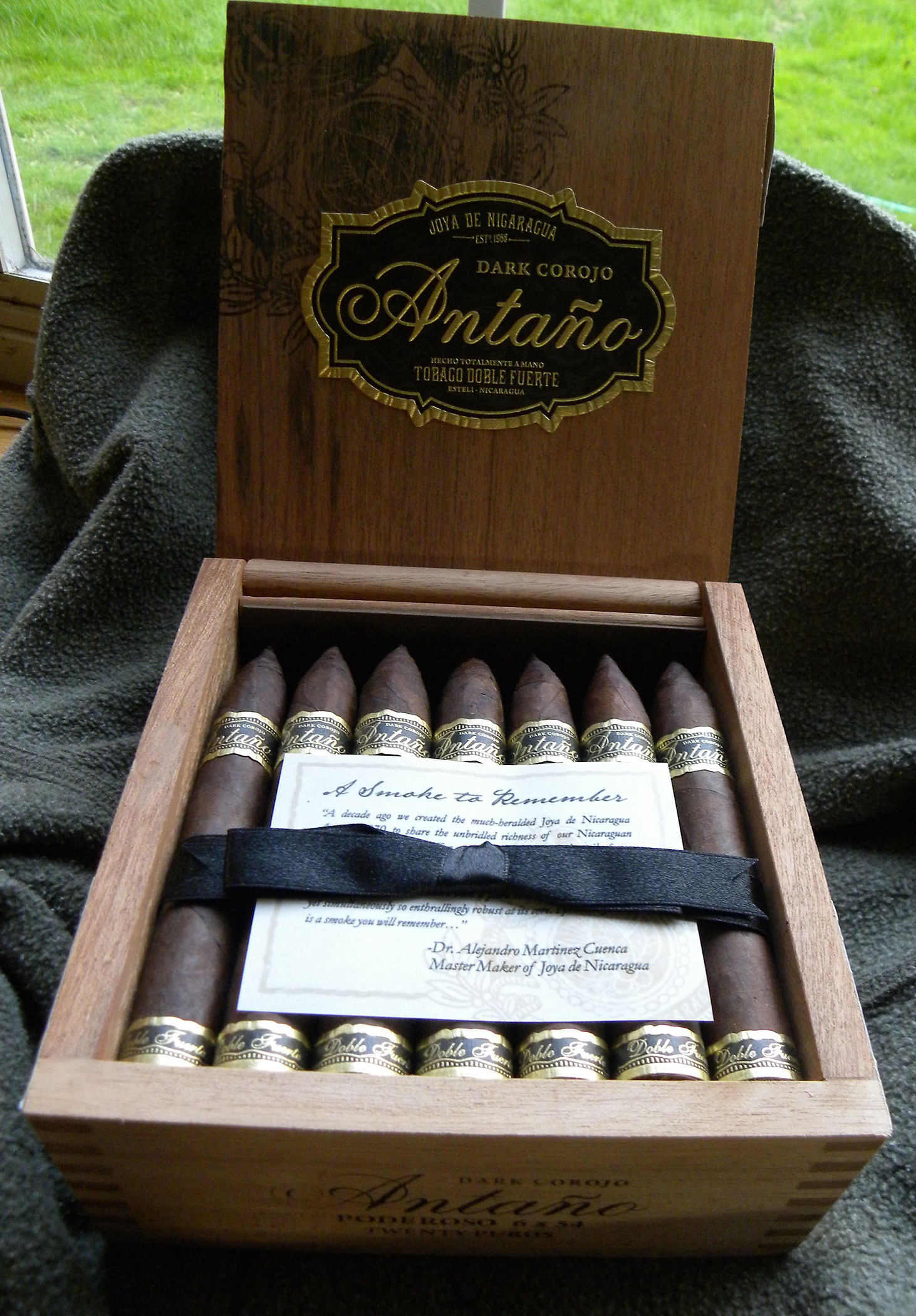
Box of JdN Antaño dark corojo doble fuerte cigars, manufactured in Nicaragua in 2011.

Cigar-making came to Nicaragua in the aftermath of the Cuban Revolution of 1959. In the years immediately following the overthrow of the regime of Fulgencio Batista by Fidel Castro, the export of raw tobacco and finished cigars from Cuba to the United States was initially permitted. This situation changed dramatically in 1962 when President John F. Kennedy imposed a stringent embargo against Cuba.

Owners of tobacco companies and leading growers had already fled the island in the aftermath of the revolution, with its nationalization of the cigar industry. New areas for the cultivation of cigar tobacco were explored. One of the most promising of these new regions for tobacco cultivation was the fertile soils of Nicaragua.

While tobacco farming in Nicaragua was begun in 1964, the first brand manufactured in the country was Joya de Nicaragua — a company launched in 1968, By Daniel Rodriguez in joint venture with Anastasio Somoza Debayle. At the time Daniel Rodriguez and his brother, Diego Rodriguez, had been farming in the USA cigars grown in Havana, Florida. Both brothers are sons to Daniel Maria Rodriguez, who was known and recognized as the 'worlds best grower of shade tabaco' in Cuba, prior to Fidel Castro overthrow of Batista. Diego Rodriguez continued on with the tobacco operations in the USA, while his brother Daniel, operated the joint venture with Somoza in Nicaragua.

The Spanish word joya is a false friend with the English word "joy." The actual meaning of the word is "jewel" — thus, the brand name "Joya de Nicaragua" correctly translates as "Jewel of Nicaragua."

Due to the overthrow of Somoza by the communist rebels known as the Sandinistas, Joya de Nicaragua could no longer exist.

It was then during the Reagan administration's embargo on Nicaraguan goods, that the production of Joya de Nicaragua was moved across the border to Honduras, where production was handled in the facilities of Nestor Plasencia. There was additional difficulty with the trademark, which had been sold after to the downfall of the Somoza regime. The company was in disarray and was sold via a public auction.

=== Development ===
In 1994, Joya de Nicaragua was purchased by Dr. Alejandro Ernesto Martínez Cuenca (born 1947 in Managua).

During the Sandinista Revolution, Martínez Cuenca, a member of the Sandinista Party, served as Minister of Foreign Trade for the Sandinista government.

Having purchased the company in the aftermath of the revolution, Martínez Cuenca set about improving the quality, which along with the company's esteem had fallen during the 1980s. As one observer put it, the deterioration of Joya de Nicaragua had been the unfortunate result of a "failed social experiment in which company operations were managed by factory workers." Old rollers and blenders were rehired and the company released what would become its signature cigar, the Joya de Nicaragua Antaño 1970, a spicy blend with the intent of reviving the company's original brand.

Joya de Nicaragua was buoyed by the cigar boom of the 1990s in the United States, a period in which demand for hand-rolled cigars far outpaced the available supply. Solid sales enabled the struggling company to bank reserve funds and to survive the downturn which followed, and repurchases the Joya de Nicaragua trademark for the American market from tobacco giant Altadis, which had obtained it in one of its many acquisitions.

Joya de Nicaragua is known for making Nicaraguan puros — cigars that make use of binders, fillers, and wrappers from that country only.

The brand is distributed in the United States by Drew Estate, a country which in 2009 accounted for approximately 45% of the company's global sales.

In September 2025, the brand announced that the USA distribution agreement with Drew Estate would end at the end of the year. In December 2025, it was announced that the brand would once again be distributed in the USA market with Quesada Cigar's SAG Imports.

== Products ==
(as listed by manufacturer in 2022)

Obras Maestras range:

- Dos Cientos special limited edition
- Número Uno
- Cinco Decadas
- Cuatro Cinco

Nicaraguan Heritage range:

- Antaño
- Antaño CT
- Antaño Gran Reserva
- Antaño Dark Corojo
- Antaño Shut the box special limited edition

Joya range:

- Cabinetta
- Red
- Black
- Silver

Rosalones range:

- Rosalones
- Rosalones Reserva

Clásico range:

- Clásico Original
- Clasico Medio Siglo

Products currently not listed by manufacturer:

- Antaño 1970
- Celebración
- Fuerte Serie B
- CyB (formerly known as "Cuenca y Blanco")

== Vitolas ==
Joya de Nicaragua produces cigars in a broad range of shapes and sizes. The size of a vitola can vary between different cigar types and cigar ranges, for example a Toro can be 6 1/4x50, 6x50, and 6x52, and it could be available to an Antaño CT but not to the Antaño gran reserva, or a Cinco Decadas.

Below is a diagram of currently produced cigars with their available vitolas (dated August 2022).

Some different vitola than listed below can still be found in some shops or on the internet, for example the Clásico Original in Torpedo or Perla vitola. this is most probably stock from before changes to the product range was made by the manufacturer. Also some are not available in all countries, for example the Cinco Décadas cigar is not available in the USA with the El Embargo 6x60 vitola.

Vitola				Obras Maestras				Nicaraguan Heritage					Joya				Clásico		Rosalones	
Vitola				Dos Cientos	Número Uno	Cinco Décadas	Cuatro Cinco	Antaño	Antaño CT	Antaño Dark Corojo	Antaño Gran Reserva	Antaño shut the box	Cabinetta	Red	Black	Silver	Clásico original	Clásico medio siglo	Rosalones	Rosalones Reserva
Gran Toro	6	x	54	O																
L'Ambassadeur	6 _{5/8}	x	44		O															
Le Premier	6 _{7/8}	x	48		O															
El General	7	x	50			O														
Diadema	6	x	54			O														
Fundador	6	x	54			O														
El Doctor	6	x	52			O														
El Embargo	6	x	60			O														
Toro	6 _{1/4}	x	50				O													
Torpedo	6	x	52				O										O			
Doble Robusto	5	x	56				O								O					
Petit Corona	4 _{1/2}	x	46				O													
Belicoso	6	x	54					O	O		O		O							
Toro	6	x	50						O								O	O		
Corona Gorda	6 _{1/4}	x	46						O				O							
Robusto	5	x	52						O											
Robusto Grande	5 _{1/2}	x	52					O			O	O								
Gran Cónsul	4 _{3/4}	x	60					O			O	O								
Poderoso	6	x	54							O										
La Niveladora	6	x	52							O										
El Martillo	5 _{1/2}	x	54							O										
Peligroso	5	x	44							O										
La Pesadilla	4 _{3/4}	x	60							O										
Azarosa	4 _{1/2}	x	52							O										
Lancero	7 _{1/2}	x	38					O												
Churchill	6 _{7/8}	x	48					O									O			
Gran Perfecto	6	x	60					O												
Magnum 660	6	x	60					O												
Alisado	6	x	52					O												
Machito	4 _{3/4}	x	42					O												
Cónsul	4 _{1/2}	x	52					O									O			
Churchill	6 _{7/8}	x	46										O							
Toro	6	x	52										O	O	O	O				
Robusto	5	x	50										O			O	O	O		
Cañonazo	5 _{1/2}	x	54											O						
Robusto	5 _{1/4}	x	50											O	O					
Short Churchill	4 _{3/4}	x	48											O						
Half Corona	3 _{3/4}	x	46											O						
Nocturno	6 _{1/4}	x	50												O					
Ultra	6 _{1/4}	x	46													O				
Corona	5 _{1/4}	x	42													O				
Número 6	6	x	41														O	O		
Séleccion B	5 _{1/2}	x	42														O	O		
Viajante	8 _{1/2}	x	52														O			
Senorita	5 _{1/2}	x	34														O			
Piccolino	4 _{1/8}	x	30														O			
RR 650	6	x	50																	O
RR 546	5	x	46																	O
RR 550	5	x	50																	O
RR 444	4	x	44																	O
654	6	x	54																O	
552	5	x	52																O	
448	4	x	48																O	
446	4	x	46																O	
342	3	x	42																O	
				Dos Cientos	Número Uno	Cinco Décadas	Cuatro Cinco	Antaño	Antaño CT	Antaño Dark Corojo	Antaño Gran Reserva	Antaño shut the box	Cabinetta	Red	Black	Silver	Clásico Original	Clásico Medio Siglo	Rosalones	Rosalones Reserva

== See also ==
- List of cigar brands
