= Guantanamera (disambiguation) =

"Guantanamera" is a Cuban song by Joseíto Fernández, recorded by many artists.

Guantanamera may also refer to:

- Guantanamera (The Sandpipers album), 1966
- Guantanamera (cigar), a cigar brand
- Guantanamera (film), a 1995 Cuban comedy film
- "Guantanamera (She's Hot)", a song by Pitbull from the 2010 album Armando
