= Padrón Cigars =

American-Nicaraguan cigar maker

Piloto Cigars Inc.
- Type: Private
- Industry: Cigar industry
- Founded: Miami, United States (September 8, 1964)
- Founder: José Orlando Padrón
- Headquarters: Miami, Florida, United States
- Area served: Worldwide
- Key people: José Orlando Padrón, Founder and Executive Chairman; Jorge Padrón, President; Orlando Padrón, Vice President
- Products: Padrón Serie 1926, Padrón Serie 1964
- Subsidiaries: cigar factory in Estelí, Nicaragua
- Website: www.padron.com

Padrón Cigars (formally known as Piloto Cigars Inc.) is a private company that produces cigars in Nicaragua. The company was founded in September 8, 1964, in Miami, Florida, by Cuban-native José Orlando Padrón. In 1970, Padrón moved the company to Estelí, Nicaragua.

Padrón Cigars is managed and curated by three generations of the Padrόn family, under the leadership of José O. Padrón, and Jorge Padrón. The company controls all aspects of cigar production, including tobacco growing, sorting, processing, cigar manufacturing, and distribution.

== Company history ==
=== Origins ===
Damaso Padrón, Jose Orlando Padrón's grandfather, immigrated to Cuba from the Canary Islands (Spain) in the middle 1800s when he was a young boy. As was designated in those days, the "isleños" (English: islanders) were made to work in the tobacco fields. With what little money they had, the Padrón family bought a small farm in the Pinar del Río region of Cuba, Las Obas. At that time they made $7 every 100 pounds (45 kg) of tobacco they cultivated in Cuba. From there, the Padrón family continued to buy farms around the Pinar del Río region including a factory in Piloto, where the name of Jose's company, Piloto Cigars, is derived.

Jose Orlando Padrón was born in 1926 in Cuba and grew up near the Pinar del Río region, famed for its tobacco. His family has been working in the tobacco industry since the 1850s, and, when Jose moved from Cuba in 1961 after his tobacco farm was nationalized by Fidel Castro, went to Spain, then New York, and then he brought over a century's worth of tobacco knowledge to Miami. In Miami, Jose earned $60 every month from government aid to Cuban refugees. After a friend gave him a small hammer, Jose obtained a carpentry job. It was this job that enabled him to raise the $600 to start his own cigar brand and business. To this day, the little hammer has been a symbol of Jose's start as a cigar blender and manufacturer.

Padrón produced 200 cigars a day, made in typical Cuban rolling style, with one torcedor. Padrón then came to the idea of making a new cigar, the "Fuma". Made completely from Connecticut broadleaf tobacco, many bought this cigar for its curly head cap, which resembled the traditional cigars from Cuba.

It soon became very limiting to deal only with Connecticut broadleaf tobacco because of its long curing process. Padrón was approached by a man from a tobacco company in Nicaragua touring around for potential buyers, who asked him to inspect his tobacco for its quality. Padrón thought very well of his tobacco and told him to come back after his trip to Europe so he may travel to Nicaragua and inspect the tobacco and the fields. There, in the Jalapa valley of Nicaragua, Padrón found the tobacco he would use for his cigars.

=== Move to Nicaragua ===
Jose Padrón began using the Nicaraguan tobacco in 1967, but due to inability to meet the demands of his consumers, he moved his company to Estelí, Nicaragua in 1970 — a country with numerous political troubles at the time. Padrón tried to remain apolitical during his stay in Nicaragua however, after riots broke out and Padrón's factory was burnt down, Jose began to search for another location for his business.

While the factory in Nicaragua was rebuilt soon after the disaster, another factory was established across the border in Honduras. After the Sandinista rebellion and take over, there was much uncertainty at the Padrón factory as to what the workers were to do. Padrón asked them to continue working, and eventually Padrón returned to Nicaragua where he spoke to a Sandinista official, who promised him there would be no more problems with his factory.

=== Nicaraguan blockade ===
A new problem arose for Padrón after making peace with the Sandinistas: the United States embargo against Nicaragua enacted by President Ronald Reagan on Nicaraguan products. Padrón scrambled to move as much tobacco and cigars from Nicaragua to Tampa, Florida during the 5 days allotted before the blockade took effect. He was later granted an extension by the U.S. government to continue to move his product for another 6 months, then, whatever stock he had left in Nicaragua, remained there. After the blockade lifted, Padrón shifted his main operation back to Nicaragua, where it still remains today.

=== Current history ===
As president, Jorge is moving into the director's position for the company; making more trips to visit the factories in Estelí and working on the business end of the company. It is the intent of the Padrón family that Jorge will eventually take the main leadership role in the company one day. Jose Orlando Padrón died on December 5, 2017.

In 2003, the company opened a new 12,000-square-foot (1,100 m^{2}) rolling facility in Estelí, Nicaragua, a building twice the size of the company's previous Estelí facility. The new rolling center was the 17th building owned by Padrón in Estelí and brought the company's usable space in the city up to a total of 75,000 square feet (7,000 m^{2}), mostly dedicated to the storage of tobacco. At that time the company maintained an inventory sufficient for more than 25 million cigars — six years' worth of production.

== Product line ==
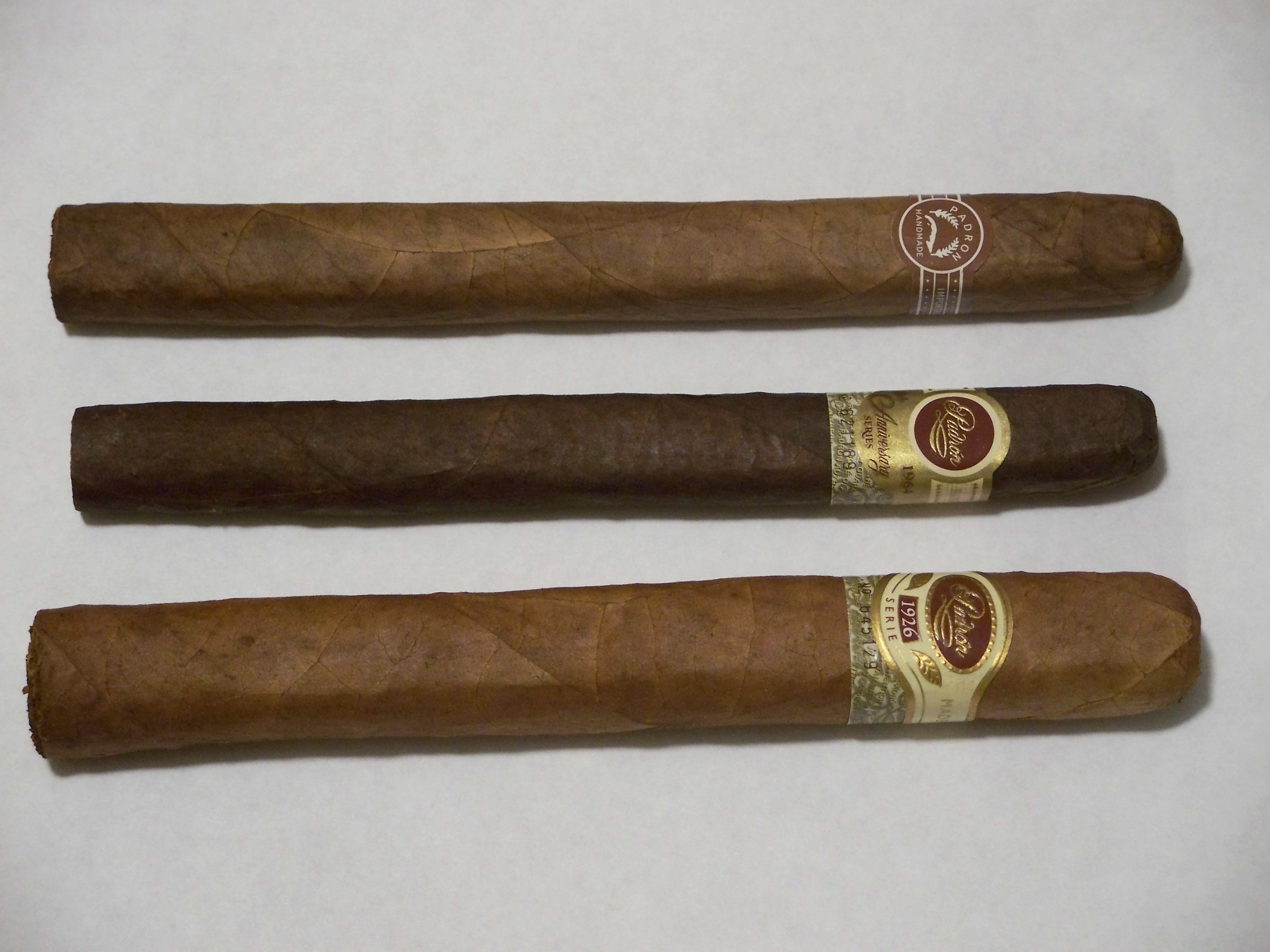
Examples of Padrón's three most common production series: a standard Padrón cigar (top); an Anniversary series (middle); and a Serie 1926 (bottom).

The Padrón cigar company makes three different blends of cigar, all with their own unique flavor and sizes. They also offer cigars and many different price points.

=== Padrón Series ===
There are fifteen vitolas in the Padrón series. Each is available in a natural and a maduro wrapper. With the exception of the Corticos, the band for all of the vitolas is brown with "Padrón" and "Handmade" in white lettering. The wrapper, filler, and binder leaves are all sun-grown habano from Nicaragua, aged two-and-one-half years.

Name	Vitola	Length (in.)	Ring Gauge
Delicias	Corona Extra	4 7/8	46
2000	Robusto	5	50
Londres	Corona	5 ½	42
3000	Robusto	5 ½	52
5000	Robusto	5 ½	56
Palmas	Corona	6 ½	42
4000	Double Corona	6 ½	54
Panatela	Panatela	6 7/8	36
6000	Torpedo	5 ½	52
Ambassador	Lonsdale	6 7/8	42
Churchill	Churchill	6 7/8	46
Executive	Churchill	7 ½	50
Magnum	Giant	9	50
7000	Toro	6 ¼	60
Corticos		4 ¼	35

=== Padrón 1964 Anniversary Series ===
In 1994, Padrón introduced the 1964 Anniversary Series, in celebration of the company's 30-year anniversary. Like the regular Padrón series, these cigars are made entirely from Nicaraguan-grown tobacco, and are available in both natural and maduro wrappers The series is limited in its production and to assure authenticity, the company labels each individual cigar with its own 6-digit serial number.

Name	Vitola	Length (in.)	Ring Gauge
Diplomatico	Double Corona	7	50
Piramide	Pyramid	6 7/8	52
Exclusivo	Robusto	5 ½	50
Monarca	Grand Corona	6 ½	46
Superior	Lonsdale	6 ½	42
Corona	Long corona	6	42
Principe	Corona extra	4 ½	46
Imperial	Toro	6	54
Torpedo	Torpedo	6	52

=== Padron Serie 1926 ===
The third cigar blend Padrón offers is the Padrón Serie 1926, created in 2002 in honor of Jose Padrón's 75th birthday, with the "1926" a reference to the family patriarch's birth year. Consisting of 7 vitolas, each cigar features either a sun-grown habano natural or Maduro wrapper, and contains Nicaraguan tobacco aged for no less than five years. Just like the Padrón 1964 Anniversary blend, the Padrón Serie 1926 is box pressed and has 6 digit security codes on their bands to ensure against counterfeiting.

The Padrón 1926 Serie Famous 75th, released in November 2015, comes in a 5 x 54 box pressed robusto vitola, and is available in either a Nicaraguan habano or Nicaraguan habano maduro wrapper.

Only 1500 boxes of each version are being produced, with box prices set at $210 and single stick prices at $21.

Name	Vitola	Length (in.)	Ring Gauge
No. 35	Rothschild (short Robusto)	4	48
No. 6	Robusto	4 and ¾	50
No. 9	Robusto	5 and ¼	56
No. 47	Robusto	5 and ½	50
No. 90	Tubo	5 and ½	52
No. 2	Belicoso	5 and ½	52
No. 1	Toro	6 and ¾	54
40th Anniversary	Torpedo	6 and ½	54
75th Anniversary	Robusto	5	54
80th Anniversary	Figurado	6 and ¾	54

=== Padron Family Reserve ===
The fourth and final cigar blends that Padrón offers is the Padrón Family Reserve. They were first created in 2009, and each different blend was created to commemorate a special date to the company, with exception to the 85 year which was created for Jose Orlando Padrón's birthday. Consisting of 6 unique blends, each cigar features either a sun-grown habano natural or Maduro wrapper, and contains Nicaraguan tobacco aged for a minimum of ten years. Just like the Padrón 1964 Anniversary and Padrón Serie 1926 blends, all six blends are box pressed and have 6 digit security codes on their bands to ensure against counterfeiting.

Name	Vitola	Length (in.)	Ring Gauge
44 Years	Torpedo	6	52
45 Years	Toro	6	52
46 Years	Robusto Grande	5 and ½	56
50 Years	Robusto	5	54
50th Anniversary "The Hammer"	Toro	6 and ½	50
85 Years	Robusto	5 and ¼	50

== Awards/Recognition/Ratings ==
- Serie 1926 No. 9 was designated one of the Best Padron Cigars by Cigars Direct.
- Serie 1926 40th Anniversary was designated one of the 25 Best Cigars of 2004 by Cigar Aficionado magazine.

Padrón has received numerous awards and high ratings from many respected cigar critics, connoisseurs and aficionados. The Thousand series has received over sixty one ratings, the lowest being an 88 and the highest being a 94 on a one hundred point scale. The Padrón 1964 Anniversary blend has received sixty two ratings, the lowest being a 90 and the highest being a 95 on a one hundred point scale. The Padrón Serie 1926 blend has received twenty seven ratings, the lowest being a 90 and the highest being a 97 on a 100-point scale. The special release Padrón 1964 Anniversary "A" received a rating of 91 twice, while the newest Padrón 1964 Anniversary "Millennium" has received no ratings.

== See also ==
- List of cigar brands
