= Juan López (cigar) =

Cigar brand

Juan López is the name of a cigar brand produced on the island of Cuba for Habanos S.A., the Cuban state-owned tobacco company.

== History ==
In 1876, Juan López Sena (aka Juan López Diaz) created the Juan López brand. producing cigars in Havana on Calle de Los Dragones. In 1908, the brand was passed to his heirs and was then sold to the Sociedad Cosme Del Peso y Cía in 1918, which owned the brand until the Cuban revolution. During its history, the brand has also been labeled Flor de Juan López, only to return to the original name in time.

In September 1960, the Cuban revolutionary government nationalized the Cuban cigar industry and seized the factory where Juan López cigars were manufactured. Production has resumed, and today all Juan López cigars are made by hand at the La Habana factory in Havana.

== Non-Cuban production ==
There is also a non-Cuban "Juan Lopez" cigar made with Nicaraguan tobaccos and marketed by Altadis S.A. (now owned by Imperial Tobacco) in several sizes.

== See also ==
- Cigar brands
