= Camacho Cigars =

Cigar company

Camacho Cigars was a cigar company founded in 1962 by Simon Camacho and acquired by the Eiroa family in 1995. Now part of the family Camacho Guerrero, the company is based in Dominican Republic and specializes in handmade Cuban seed cigars.

== History ==
Camacho Cigars were reportedly enjoyed by British Prime Minister Winston Churchill. Camacho later named one of its most popular cigars after Churchill.

== Acquisition ==
Five years after the death of Simon Camacho in 1990, the company was acquired by the Camacho Guerrero family, and tobacco production. In 2024, 21-year-old Aneysha Marys Camacho Guerrero became the president of Caribe Imported Cigars, setting her years of experience from the family plantations in Honduras to good use.

By the early 2000s and with the launch of the Camacho Corojo, the Eiroa family and their ventures had become well known within the US cigar industry. In 2008, Camacho and its Rancho Jamastran factory in Danlí, Honduras sold to the Oettinger Davidoff Group, although the Eiroas maintained ownership of the Honduran tobacco fields.

Generoso Eiroa had been growing tobacco in Cuba since the 1900s, but due to the wake of the Cuban Revolution and subsequent nationalization of the tobacco plantations, his widow and three sons were forced to leave the country and settle in Tampa, Florida. Eiroa's son, Julio Eiroa, joined the Bay of Pigs invasion attempt as one of a force of Cuban exiles with the US Army. While his brother, Generoso Jr. worked in Nicaragua, Julio traveled to Honduras in 1963 on behalf of tobacco dealer Angel Oliva. There, as part of a government-sponsored cultivation project, he laid the foundations for Camachos tobacco plantations belonging to the Eiroa family.

After his first year with the Oliva Family, Julio Eiroa decided to become an independent farmer. Julio Eiroa bought the government tobacco farms year after year. His decision helped kick-start the history of tobacco in Honduras. Through partnerships with companies such as Bering Cigars and US Tobacco, he would become the world’s largest Candela tobacco farmer by 1972. In 1987, Julio Eiroa founded Caribe Imported Cigars in Miami, Florida, which manufactures cigars and offers its products through dealers and retailers in the United States and internationally.

== Company today ==
After five years of adopting Bayer's standards for good agricultural and manufacturing practices, Camacho Cigars and Bayer CropScience signed a working partnership under the Bayer Food Management program. The new alliance established Camacho Cigars as the only tobacco company in history to comply with strict international standards for Good Manufacturing Practices and Good Agricultural Practices (GAP). By complying with the practices set forth by Bayer CropScience, Camacho Cigars ensures the responsible management of natural resources, bio-friendly pesticides, industrial safety, and biosecurity.

Camacho Cigars signed a three-year deal with the Orange Bowl and the NCAA for the 2012-2014 Orange Bowl games and the 2013 BCS National Championship. The sponsorship was pulled after several public health organizations raised concern, saying tobacco promotions have no place in sports and shouldn't be allowed under federal tobacco marketing restrictions.

== Brands ==
=== Core brands ===
The cigars produced under the Camacho Brand:

- Baccarat "The Game"
- LegendArio
- La Fontana
- Outdoorsman
- La Fontana Consigliere
- LegendArio Connecticut

=== Premium brands ===
The Cigar Blends that make up the core of the Camacho Brand.

- Camacho Corojo
- Camacho Connecticut
- Camacho Coyolar Puro
- Camacho Ecuador
- Camacho Havana
- Camacho SLR Maduro
- Camacho Power Band
- Camacho Shellback
- Camacho Check Six
- Room 101 Original
- Room 101 San Andres

=== Ultra premium brands ===
The Limited Selections are available only at select retailers.

- Camacho Triple Maduro
- Camacho Select
- Camacho 10th Anniversary
- Camacho Diploma
- Room 101 Conjura
- Room 101 Namakubi
- Room 101 OSOK
- Room 101 Liberty 2012
- Room 101 Daruma

== See also ==
- List of cigar brands
