= El Paraíso, El Paraíso =

El Paraíso
- Municipality
- Location in Honduras
- Coordinates: 13°52′N 86°33′W
- Country: Honduras
- Department: El Paraíso

Area
  - Municipality: 356 km^{2} (137 sq mi)

Population (2023 projection)
  - Municipality: 47,542
  - Density: 134/km^{2} (346/sq mi)
  - Urban: 31,649

El Paraíso (Spanish pronunciation: [el paɾaˈiso]) is a town, with a population of 27,640 (2023 calculation), and a municipality in the Honduran department of El Paraíso.

The town is the site of a cigar factory operated by Nestor Plasencia, in which cigars are made under a variety of labels, including that of Rocky Patel.
