= Marsh Wheeling =

American cigar manufacturing company

M. Marsh & Son

Marsh Wheeling was founded by Mifflin M. Marsh in 1840. Located in Wheeling, West Virginia, it was the oldest cigar manufacturing company founded in the United States.

== History ==
The company originated in 1840 with Miflin Marsh producing cigars in his home. He later developed the company and opened a factory first on Water Street and later on 12th Street between Water and Main. In 1908, the company opened the location at 905–915 Market Street. Marsh Wheeling was purchased in 1988 by John Berger & Son Co. The plant in West Virginia was closed in the early 2000s and operations were transferred to National Cigar, shifting production to Frankfort, Indiana. A company lawyer attributed the closure of the factory to factors such as demographic trends reducing the demand for cigars and West Virginia tobacco liability law.

The company was known for the Marsh Wheeling brand of stogies which were sold at a low price point, and its products appeared in movies such as The Green Mile and How the West Was Won. The cigar's famous box became a known staple of the tobacco industry.

== See also ==
- List of cigar brands
- List of historic sites in Ohio County, West Virginia
