= A. J. Fernandez Cigars =

Nicaraguan cigar maker

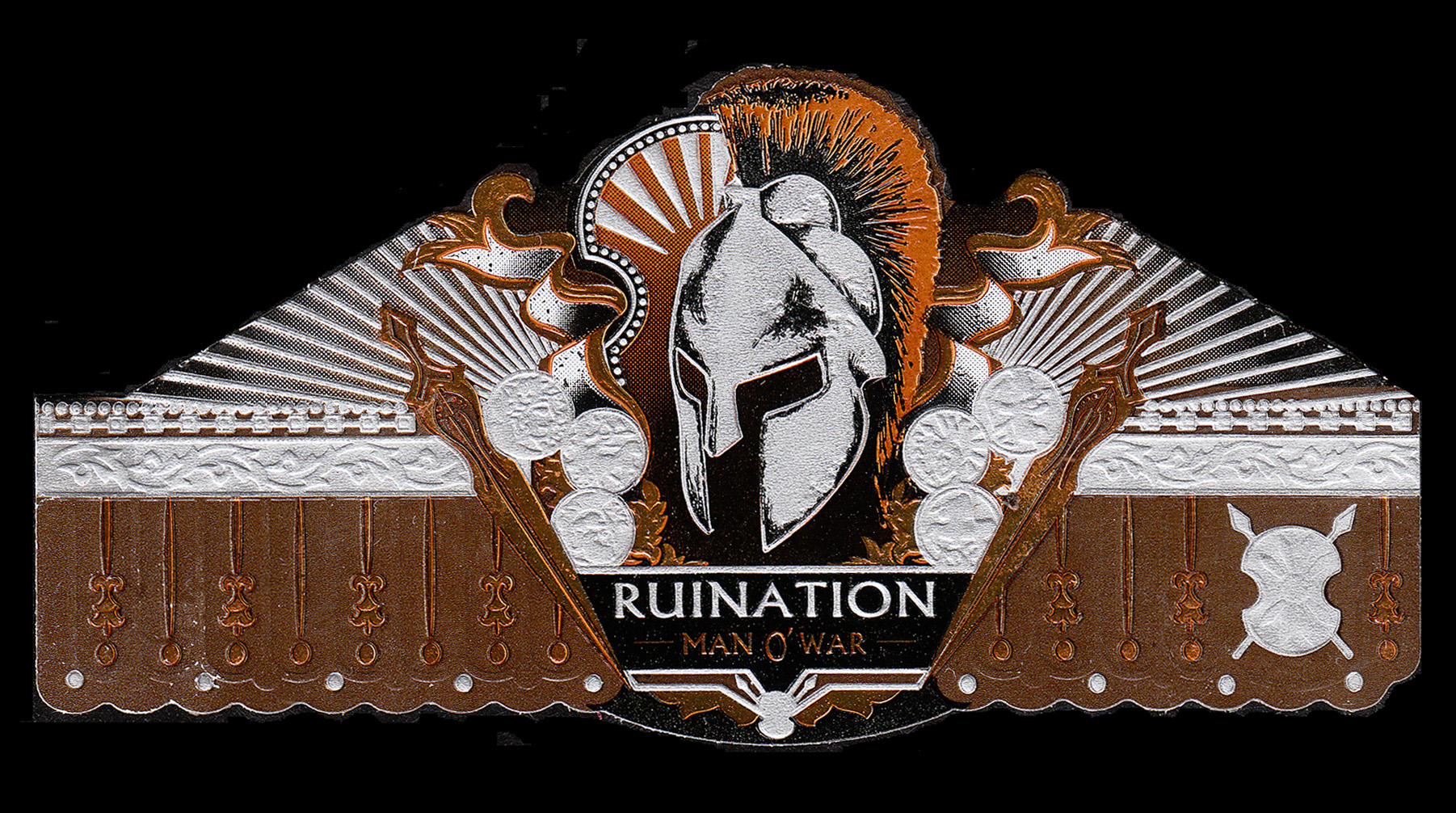
Cigar band from a Man O' War Ruination, manufactured in Nicaragua by A.J. Fernandez Cigars.

Tabacalera Fernandez, best known to the English-speaking world as A.J. Fernandez Cigars, is a maker of cigars primarily grown and produced in Nicaragua and sold worldwide. The company is run by Abdel Y. Fernandez, a third generation cigarmaker, and is a prominent manufacturer of cigars sold under a variety of labels, including "Man O'War," "Diesel," and "San Lotano".

== Company history ==
=== Forerunners ===
A.J. Fernandez Cigars traces its roots back to San Luís, Cuba, where Abdel's grandfather started the San Lotano brand.

=== Development ===
Tabacalera Fernandez started in a decrepit facility in Estelí, Nicaragua with just six rollers. Rather than launching his own brand from the start, Fernandez first established himself as a manufacturer of cigars for other companies, such as the Rocky Patel Summer Blend 2008, which was produced in Fernandez's "Tafenic" factory in Estelí.

A.J. Fernandez (born March 1979) first earned his stripes as the manufacturer of the brands "Man O'War" and "Diesel" for sale by mailorder retail giant Cigars International and its associated companies. Man O'War, introduced nationally in the United States in 2009, is a medium-to-full bodied blend that quickly developed what contemporary cigar historian Richard B. Perelman has described as a "near cult status." In 2010, two new additions were made to the brand, a mild-to-medium product wrapped in a claro colored leaf called Man O'War Virtue, and a full-bodied product wrapped in a Colorado-maduro leaf called Man O'War Ruination. In 2011, a new blend made as a classic Cuban-sized corona with a ragged foot called the Man O'War Puro Authentico was introduced as well as a limited-production super premium called Man O'War Armada.

The Diesel line, also launched in 2009, initially consisted of a single vitola — a thick 5-inch belicoso that the company called the "Unholy Cocktail." This was later supplemented by an even-shorter 60-ring robusto called the "Shorty." A second full-bodied blend, called Diesel Unlimited, was launched in 2010 in 4 vitolas, including a massive 7-inch, 60-ring double corona.

=== Company today ===
The Fernandez factory in Estelí sustained a fire on March 31, 2025, damaging the packaging department where millions of cigars were destroyed.

In the summer of 2010, Fernandez revived the long-discontinued San Lotano brand previously made by his grandfather in Cuba in the years before the Cuban Revolution of 1959.

A.J. Fernandez Cigars currently sells its products in more than 32 countries, with sales outside of the United States accounting for approximately 10% of the company's total sales in 2013.

== See also ==
- List of cigar brands
