= Aristoff =

Aristoff is a brand of cigar. The leaves (wrapper, binder, and filler) are exclusively grown and cured in Nicaragua. The cigars are all hand-rolled in Chinandega, Nicaragua and at the company's Honduras-based satellite factory. However, The corporate headquarters of this firm lies in Fort Lauderdale, Florida, with their principal market being the American Eastern Seaboard. As a relatively new company, the brand was launched amid great fanfare in 2002. The company was marketed heavily on the internet and through a viral marketing campaign. The great expectations fell flat, however, when the first few series of cigars did not meet with popular approval. Sales of the product fell 78% after the first year. Due to this plunge in revenue, the IPO in the company was called off in April 2003.

The company's new series of cigars has been more accepted among the cigar market. Sales have increased steadily since hitting a trough in 2004.

Aristoff was originally created by Guy Benhamou, the CEO of OroAmerica in Burbank, CA and Ted Coulter, General Manager of LA Estillos in the Dominican Republic in 1996. OroAmerica at the time was the largest producer of Karat Gold Jewelry in the US. OroAmerica had jewelry operations in San Pedro de Marcoris Dominican Republic at the time and began to diversify into premium cigars in the mid-1990s. Benhamou and Coulter began developing Aristoff in 1996 and formed the company Cigar America which was a wholly owned subsidiary of OroAmerica. After investing a large amount of money into this product, they sold the brand and inventory to JR Cigars in 2000, which continued to manufacture Aristoff in Honduras. These cigars were made out of high quality tobacco but there was too much competition during the boom in the late 1990s.

The original blend of the Aristoff used 100% Dominican grown tobacco for the binder and filler. For the wrapper, Aristoff used tobacco from several different sources including Brazil, United States (Conn Shade) and Cameroon.

Aristoff had a state-of-the-art retail store on Rodeo Drive in Beverly Hills, California, but because of a trademark infringement, he was not allowed to use the name "Aristoff" for the store name. Cigar America also developed a lower-priced brand called "Fuego Del Rey" which was produced in Jember, Indonesia. The flavored version of this cigar was rated by the Robb Report as the best-flavored cigar in the US market.

== See also ==
- List of cigar brands
- Greycliff
