= Maya Selva =

Honduran cigar maker and tobacco grower (born 1965)

Maya Selva (born August 9, 1965) is a Honduran cigar maker and tobacco grower.

== Early life ==
Maya Selva was born in Tegucigalpa, Honduras, to a French mother and a Honduran father. She grew up in Tegucigalpa, but moved to France at age of sixteen to study. After graduating from high school, she trained to be an engineer in the École internationale des sciences du traitement de l'information - School of Engineering (EISTI) and completed her education in the United States with a Master of Science degree.

In 1991, she returned to Honduras, where she explored several career possibilities, and eventually those links to tobacco.

== Early career ==
In 1993, Maya Selva met Nestor Plasencia, a renowned tobacco grower and cigar maker. After sharing with Plasencia her dream of introducing a high-quality premium Honduran cigar to the French market, she began learning the business, with him as her mentor, in his Tabacos de Oriente factory in Danli, Honduras. Maya spent more than a year learning how cigars are made, and how to produce a top quality cigar.

== Maya Selva in Honduras ==
Maya was always interested in the cigar know-how and tradition in Honduras, where the hand-rolled cigar activity is considered an Intangible Cultural Heritage of the Republic by the National Congress of Honduras.

She consider Honduras one of her two homes, and her connection with the people who make her cigars in Honduras has a strong bond. The values that are Maya Selva Cigares’ hallmark are stringent quality requirements and respect for the land and its communities.

She is fully involved in the Honduran tobacco industry and is one of the founding members of the Honduran Association of Cigar Makers along with the Plasencias, Eiroas, General Cigar, and Consolidated Cigar. She was one of the organizers of the first cigar festival in Honduras in 2011, called Humo Jaguar.

== Maya Selva label ==
In 1995, Maya started Flor de Selva, her first brand, made from tobacco grown in the highlands of the Jamastrán Valley, in El Paraíso, Honduras. Flor de Selva included five cigars that went on sale in France the same year: Panetela, Robusto, Corona, Churchill and Doble-Corona.

In 1997, the Flor de Selva Robusto, was called a classic by L'Amateur de Cigare magazine.

The collections of Flor de Selva are Classic, Maduro and Colección Aniversario N° 20.

In 1999, Maya Selva debuted with a new brand called Cumpay, made from tobacco grown in the volcanic highlands of the Jalapa Valley in Nicaragua.

Cumpay collection goes by the slogan "Puro Nicaragua".

In 2002, Selva partnered with Armando Andres Diaz—who had helped her develop Flor de Selva and Cumpay with Plasencia—to open her own factory in Danli, to produce her third line of Cigars: Villa Zamorano.

Villa Zamorano was created to offer aficionados a real handmade cigar from the finest tobaccos for a machine-made price.

This line includes Classic and Reserva collections.

The Maya Selva Cigares headquarters are located in central Paris, managing the distribution in Europe, the tobacco plantations and factories are located in Honduras and Nicaragua, and a distribution center for the USA is in Hollywood, Florida.

The Maya Selva Cigars brands were launched in 2017 in Hong Kong and Japan.

Maya Selva and her brands are fully established in the European market. The specialized magazine Cigar Journal named her Europe's most prominent female cigar manufacturer, in the 2015 Fall issue.

== Maya Selva Cigars awards ==
| Year | Brand | Cigar | Rate / Award | Reference |
|---|---|---|---|---|
| 2010 | Flor de Selva | Tempo | Best of the Best | Cigar Journal (DE) |
| 2011 | Flor de Selva | Tempo | Best Buy | Cigar Journal (DE) |
| 2012 | Flor de Selva | Tempo | 95 | Cigar Journal (DE) |
| 2012 | Flor de Selva | Robusto Maduro | 95 | Cigar Journal (DE) |
| 2013 | Flor de Selva | Robusto Maduro | Best Buy | Cigar Journal (DE) |
| 2014 | Flor de Selva | N°15 | 91 | Cigar Journal (DE) |
| 2014 | Flor de Selva | N°15 | Best Buy | Cigar Journal (DE) |
| 2014 | Villa Zamorano | Gordo | 92 | Cigar Journal (DE) |
| 2014 | Cumpay | Volcán | 90 | Cigar Journal (DE) |
| 2015 | Flor de Selva | Doble - Corona | Best Buy | Cigar Journal (DE) |
| 2015 | Flor de Selva | Doble Corona | 91 | Cigar Journal (DE) |
| 2015 | Flor de Selva | N°20 | 91 | Cigar Journal (DE) |
| 2015 | Flor de Selva | N°15 Maduro | 90 | Cigar Journal (DE) |
| 2016 | Flor de Selva | Lancero | Cigare de L´Année | L´Amateur de Cigare |
| 2016 | Flor de Selva | Grand Pressé | Best Buy | Cigar Journal (DE) |
| 2016 | Flor de Selva | Grand Pressé | 91 | Cigar Journal (DE) |
| 2016 | Flor de Selva | Toro Maduro | 91 | Cigar Journal (DE) |
| 2016 | Villa Zamorano | Expreso | 92 | Cigar Journal (DE) |
| 2016 | Villa Zamorano | Expreso | Top 10 Best Cigars | Cigar Journal (DE) |
| 2016 | Cumpay | Short | 91 | Cigar Journal (DE) |
| 2017 | Cumpay | No. 15 | 90 | Cigar Journal (DE) |
| 2017 | Flor de Selva | Doble - Corona | Cigare de L´Année | L´Amateur de Cigare |
| 2017 | Flor de Selva | Egoísta N° 20 | Top 25 Cigars | Cigar Journal (DE) |
| 2017 | Flor de Selva | Egoísta | 91 | Cigar Journal (DE) |
| 2017 | Flor de Selva | Petit Corona N°20 | 90 | Cigar Journal (DE) |
| 2018 | Flor de Selva | | Best Brand Honduras Category | L´Amateur de Cigare |
| 2018 | Villa Zamorano | Churchill | 90 | Cigar Journal (DE) |
| 2019 | Flor de Selva | Churchill | 91 | Cigar Journal (DE) |
| 2019 | Flor de Selva | Colección Maduro | Cigar of the Year | Tobacco Business |
| 2019 | Flor de Selva | N°15 Maduro | Rank 12 - Top 25 | Tobacco Business |
