= Nat Sherman =

American tobacco brand

- Company type: Subsidiary
- Industry: Tobacco
- Founded: 1930; 96 years ago
- Founder: Nat Sherman
- Headquarters: 12 E 42nd St; New York City, New York, U.S.
- Key people: Joel Sherman
- Products: Cigars, cigarettes, gifts and accessories
- Parent: Altria
- Website: natshermanintl.com
- Footnotes / references Carcinogenicity: IARC group 1

Nat Sherman is the brand name for a line of handmade cigars and "luxury cigarettes". The company, which began as a retail tobacconist, continued to operate a flagship retail shop, known as the "Nat Sherman Townhouse", located on 42nd Street, off Fifth Avenue, in New York City from 1930 to 2020. Corporate offices are now located at the foot of the George Washington Bridge in Fort Lee, New Jersey.

== Company history ==
=== Origin ===
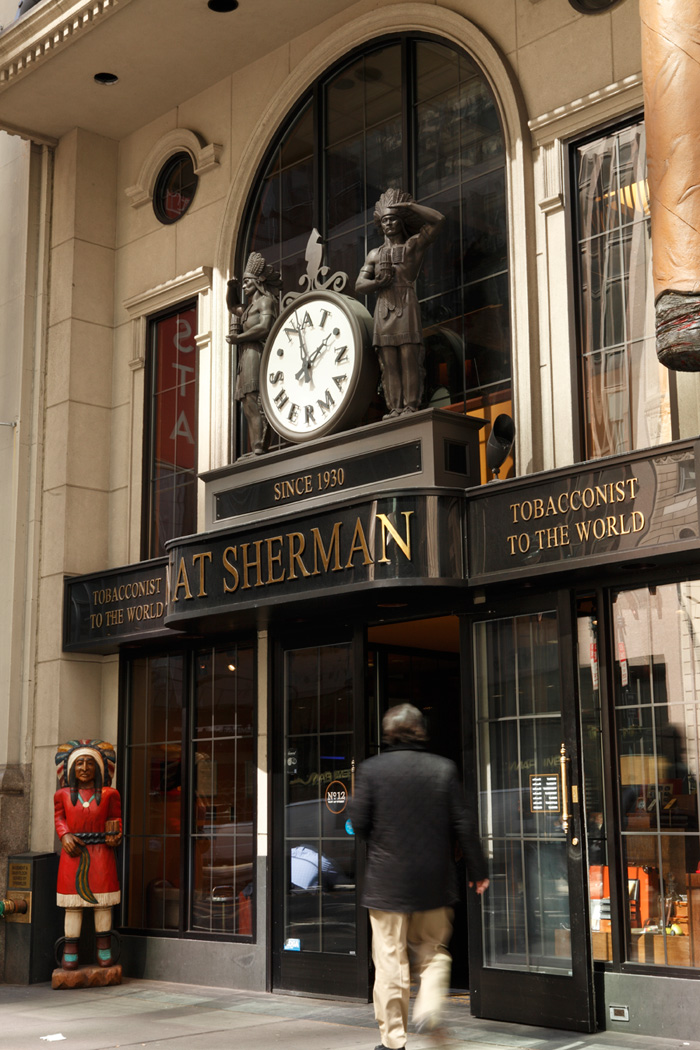
Nat Sherman store in New York City

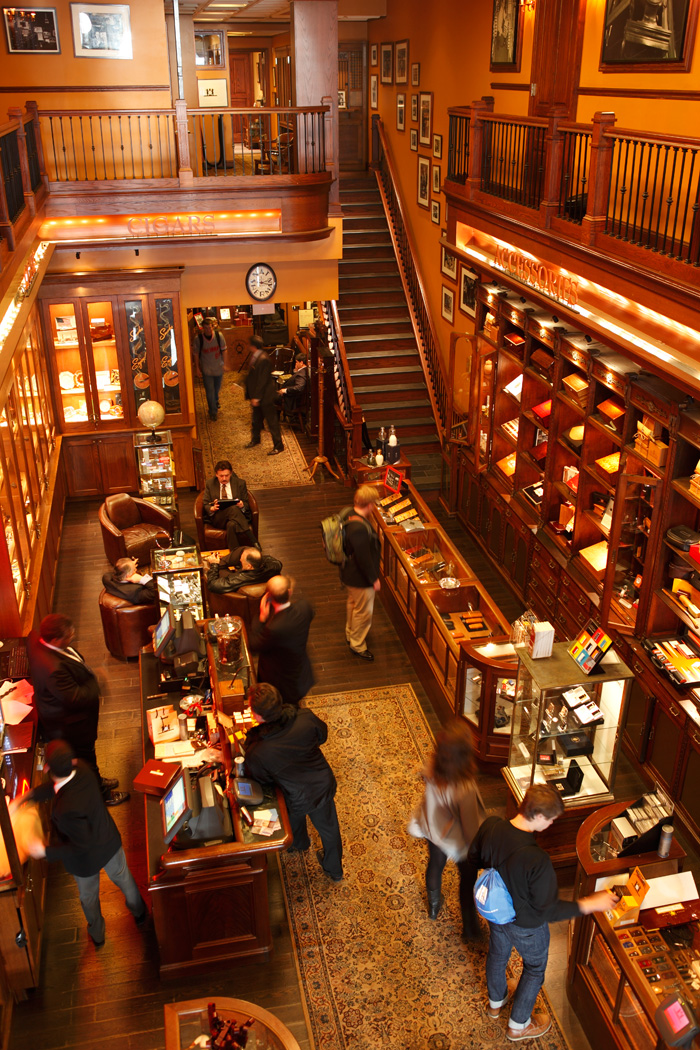
Inside the Nat Sherman store

Before he was involved in the tobacco industry, Nat Sherman made his fortune running a prominent speakeasy in New York City during the 1920s, when Prohibition made such a business extremely lucrative, albeit risky. Perhaps as the result of settlement of a gambling debt, his son later speculated, Sherman wound up as half owner of Traub Brothers and Bear, makers of the Epoca cigar brand, which introduced the nightclub proprietor into the world of tobacco manufacturing. Sherman subsequently bought out his partner to become sole owner of the Epoca brand, which was made in Havana, Cuba and Tampa, Florida.

Later, a New York real estate developer named Abe Gubertz had cash flow difficulties during the construction of a 38-story building located at 1400 Broadway, on Broadway in Manhattan. Sherman provided the struggling developer with a loan, taking retail space located in the lobby as partial payment. The shop sold cigarettes and cigars in substantial quantities to those who worked in the building and proved a means of distributing its own cigars, including Epoca and Nat Sherman-branded product. The company also was the exclusive importer and distributor of the Cuban-made Bolivar brand in the United States.

=== 1950s ===
In the 1950s, an adjoining retail space was obtained on the street, which initially was used as a candy store. The wall between the two establishments was later broken down, paving the way for an expansion of the tobacco shop, which catered to an elite customer base which included leaders in the fashion industry, theatre, and politicians. Prominent members of organized crime "families" also frequented the shop, which was regarded as "neutral ground".

Nat Sherman's son Joel, company president and CEO into the 21st century, later recalled one of the shop's most dangerous customers:

These people drank the best liquor, drove the most expensive cars, had the most beautiful women, and they smoked the best cigars. You'd find people from opposing crime families meeting in the store. They'd buy each other cigars while their bodyguards stood outside.

=== 1960s ===
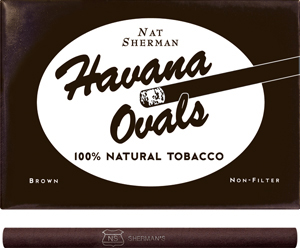
Havana Ovals small cigars

In 1950, Sherman introduced the plastic-tipped cigar to the industry, called Sherman's #25. The cigar was produced in Tampa for Sherman by Carl Cuesta, an American manufacturer of cigars for brands including Partagas. The company applied for a patent for its cigar tip, which was never granted. Nevertheless, for 32 years, the company scared off rivals by marking its packaging with the words "patent pending" and by threatening legal action.

Sherman was also a pioneer in the manufacture of cigarettes which made use of cigar tobacco, launching a product called Havana Ovals #149 early in the 1950s. According to the company, the move to specialty small cigars and cigarettes was made at the request of an irate customer who had been unable to smoke a cigar on an airplane and who had specifically requested a cigarette that tasted like a cigar.

During the 1960s, the Sherman shop expanded its wares to include pipes. Over 1,000 pipes were offered for sale in a 40-foot (12 m) long case hung along the wall of the store. The company also began to sell pipe tobacco under the "Nat Sherman" brand name. At the time of its expansion, the company's pipe department was perhaps the largest in New York City and the United States.

In the 1960s, a move was made to expand both the wholesale operations of the company and its cigarette manufacturing arm. The company's previous manufacturing facility in Wilkes-Barre, Pennsylvania, was shuttered and a move made to a new and larger facility in Englewood, New Jersey.

=== 1970s and '80s ===
In the autumn of 1976, Nat Sherman opened a shop on New York's Fifth Avenue to bolster his tobacco brand's status. A new location was opened at 711 Fifth Avenue, near the Plaza Hotel, across from Tiffany & Company. After a period of disagreements with his father, Joel Sherman left the business for about a decade.

=== 1990s ===
Naturals Selection Originals

Nat Sherman Metropolitan Selection

Joel Sherman returned to the company in 1990, the year after his father's death, He became the company's president and CEO and terminated many of the existing management staff.

The company lost its lease at 711 Fifth Avenue and moved to a new 7,000-square-foot (650 m^{2}) location on 42nd Street, around the corner from the New York Public Library. A total of $1.5 million was spent on the development of the new store, which has an inventory of about 500,000 cigars and a second-floor walk-in humidor and smoking room with leather-backed chairs.

Sherman's cigar line, Metropolitan, has been manufactured since the 1990s by MATASA in the Dominican Republic. Its Gotham 1400 and Omerta products are manufactured and distributed by Santa Clara, Inc. The company's cigarette manufacturing is conducted in its own facility in Greensboro, North Carolina.

=== 2010s ===
On January 17, 2017, Altria Group, Inc. announced that it acquired the privately held Sherman Group Holdings, LLC and its subsidiaries (Nat Sherman, LLC and Nat Sherman International, LLC).

In October of 2019 Altria Group, Inc announced it was willing to sell Nat Sherman International, LLC.

=== 2020s ===
In July 2020, Altria delisted all the legacy Nat Sherman cigarettes, leaving only the 4 Nats brand SKUs to carry the name.

On August 3, 2020, Altria announced that Nat Sherman International Inc. will cease operations by the end of September, shutting down not only its midtown Manhattan cigar store but also its entire wholesale business.

On January 6, 2021, it was announced that Ferio Tego, LLC, a new company formed by former Nat Sherman Employees Michael Herklots and Brendon Scott, acquired the premium cigar brands formerly owned and sold by Nat Sherman International, including Timeless, Metropolitan, Epoca and Ancora, among others.
