= Vegas Robaina =

Cuban cigar brand

Vegas Robaina is the name of a cigar brand, produced on the island of Cuba for Habanos SA, the Cuban state-owned tobacco company.

== History ==
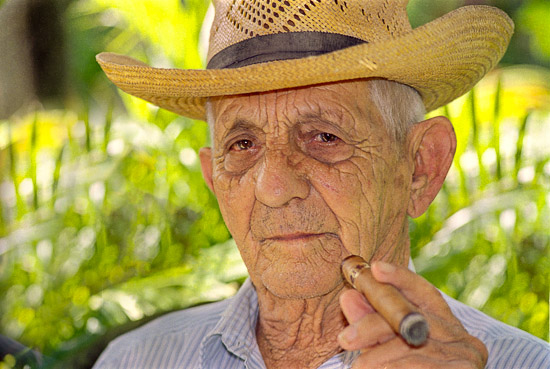
Alejandro Robaina

Alejandro Robaina was a tobacco farmer in the Vuelta Abajo of Cuba. Each year, 80% of Robaina's tobacco harvest was deemed fit for use as wrapper leaf for Cuban cigars (compared to only around 35% for other plantations). In 1997, Habanos SA launched a line of cigars bearing the name of his farmland. Vegas Robaina cigars are made in Havana at the former H. Upmann factory.

Robaina died on April 17, 2010, after being diagnosed with cancer in 2009.

== Vitolas in the Vegas Robaina line ==
The following list of vitolas de salida (commercial vitolas) within the Vegas Robaina marque lists their size and ring gauge in Imperial (and Metric), their vitolas de Galera (factory vitolas), and their common name in American cigar slang:

- Clásico - 6 1/2 in × 42 in (170 mm × 1,070 mm), Cervantes, a lonsdale [discontinued]
- Don Alejandro - 7 5/8 in × 49 in (190 mm × 1,240 mm), Prominente, a double corona
- Familiar - 5 5/8 in × 42 in (140 mm × 1,070 mm), Corona, a corona
- Famoso - 5 in × 48 in (130 mm × 1,220 mm), Hermoso No. 4, a corona extra
- Único - 6 1/8 in × 52 in (160 mm × 1,320 mm), Pirámide, a pyramid

== See also ==
- Cigar brands
