= Oliva Cigar Co. =

Cigar manufacturer

- Industry: Tobacco industry
- Genre: Cigars
- Headquarters: Miami Lakes, Florida
- Products: Cigars

Oliva Cigar Co. is the manufacturer of several brands of cigars primarily grown and produced in Nicaragua and sold internationally. Melanio Oliva began growing tobacco in Pinar del Río, Cuba, in 1886. In 1964, in the aftermath of the 1959 Cuban Revolution, Melanio's grandson Gilberto Oliva emigrated with his family to Spain before eventually moving to Nicaragua and re-entering the tobacco business. In 1995, Gilberto and his son, Gilberto Jr., launched the Gilberto Oliva brand, which became Oliva Cigar Co. The company is currently based in Miami Lakes, Florida.

== Company history ==
=== Forerunners ===
The family-owned Tabacalera Oliva Tabolisa, known in the United States as the Oliva Cigar Co., began with Melanio Oliva, who first began to produce tobacco in Pinar del Rio, Cuba in 1886. The process was continued by his son, Hipolito Oliva, who took over the growing operation during the 1920s and continued the work for several decades.

The business was assumed by Hipolito's son, Gilberto Oliva Sr., who continued until the 1959 revolution, at which time he ended his career as a grower and began working as a tobacco broker. This job took Gilberto Oliva to various countries as a buyer and eased his decision to emigrate from his native land for Spain in 1964 and from there to Nicaragua.

=== Emigration ===
After working for others, Gilberto Senior began growing tobacco on his own in 1969. According to Oliva, Nicaragua was suitable for the production of potent Cuban-style tobacco: "Nothing compares to Cuba like Nicaragua," Gilberto Senior later declared. "Northern Nicaragua enjoys all the natural blessings for great Habano."

Gilberto Senior had four children, the last of whom was born in Elizabeth, New Jersey, in 1973 because the Olivas wanted an American-born child.

Gilberto Senior continued to farm tobacco in Nicaragua for a decade, but left the country in 1979 as a result of the Sandinista revolution. Gilberto Senior spent the next six years growing tobacco in Honduras, Mexico, Panama, and the Philippines before returning to Nicaragua in 1995. Upon his return, Gilberto Senior also moved into the world of cigar manufacturing.

=== Establishment ===
The Gilberto Oliva brand was launched in 1995 with Gilberto Oliva Sr. initially making use of one of Plasencia's Honduran factories for his production. The cigars initially were composed of fillers from the Dominican Republic and Nicaragua, Dominican binder, and wrapper grown in Ecuador from Connecticut seed.

In 1996, the brand name was shortened to "Oliva."

Oliva did not achieve rapid success, but the company nevertheless managed to survive the shakeout of the numerous cigar-making startup companies which emerged in the 1990s. The cigar market grew rapidly in 1995 and 1996, but by 1997 the established giants of the industry had reacted to the increase in demand, forcing many underfinanced upstarts to fall by the wayside.

Oliva's survival was made possible due to the stock of tobacco which Gilberto Senior had produced and which was aging in storage in Nicaragua. For the next year and a half, this Nicaraguan-grown stock helped with the brand's production needs. The manufacture of spicy Nicaraguan-grown "puros," initially undertaken for financial reasons due to the down market, had the unintended consequence of improving the quality of the brand, thereby cementing its position in the marketplace.

As one writer noted-

It pushed the family closer to self-sufficiency and gave it a product that was embraced by the cigar cognoscenti in the United States. The world was falling in love with Nicaraguan tobacco, and Oliva had it to spare.

=== Development ===
Oliva opened up a new facility in Estelí in July 2003, replacing a smaller factory.

By 2005, Oliva Cigar Co. was producing 6 million cigars a year and expanding its operations continually. About 90% of the company's production was in Oliva-branded product. It was at that time the second largest grower of tobacco in Nicaragua. Within a period of four years, the company more than double its output, producing 13 million cigars for the market in 2009. The brand uses tobacco grown by the company itself in Estelí, Condega, Jalapa, and Somoto, Nicaragua.

The brand's flagship is the Oliva Serie V, a cigar launched in 2006, which was named to Cigar Aficionado magazine's list of the Best Cigars of 2008. In addition to its array of Oliva-branded products, the company also makes a line of squat, thick cigars bearing the brand-name "NUb."

The brand's premiere products are produced in a 60,000-square-foot (5,600 m^{2}) rolling facility located in Estelí, Nicaragua, capable of producing 50,000 cigars a day. Lower-end products are manufactured in a smaller facility located in Danlí, Honduras and shipped to Nicaragua for final export. Some 350 rollers were employed in the Estelí facility in 2010.

Oliva also makes cigars for other companies under contract, such as the Savinelli Liga Especial and the Savinelli Special Selection 2005.

=== Recent history ===
Oliva Cigar Family has been acquired by J. Cortes Cigars, as of Summer 2016.

The five Oliva siblings and the great-grandchildren of Melanio Oliva, remain actively involved in the family brand. Gilberto Junior runs the Nicaraguan leaf growing operation and creates blends, Carlos oversees production, Jeannie runs the office in Miami Lakes, and José directs sales.

The company employs a sales management group of 18 people, who sell Oliva products in 18 countries. Approximately 95% of Oliva's sales are made to the American market.

In 2011, Oliva Cigar Co. joined forces with Padilla as part of a project called Studio Tobac. As part of this venture Oliva was contracted by Padilla to manufacture its "Studio Tobac Special Edition" figurado. Oliva also manufactures the Nica Libre "Potencia" under contract by internet cigar retailer Meier and Dutch.

Oliva Cigar Co. is not to be confused with the Oliva Tobacco Co. of Tampa, Florida, an important tobacco grower which supplies a number of leading brands, or with the long-established brand Oliveros.

In 2025 Oliva became the official cigar of the Cigar Smoking World Championships the Oliva Mareva, created exclusively for CSWC.

== Oliva Cigar Co. brands ==
- Oliva
- Flor de Oliva
- Master Blends 3
- Nub
- Cain
- Cain Nub
- Viejo Mundo
- Nub Nuance

== See also ==
- List of cigar brands
