= Alejandro Robaina =

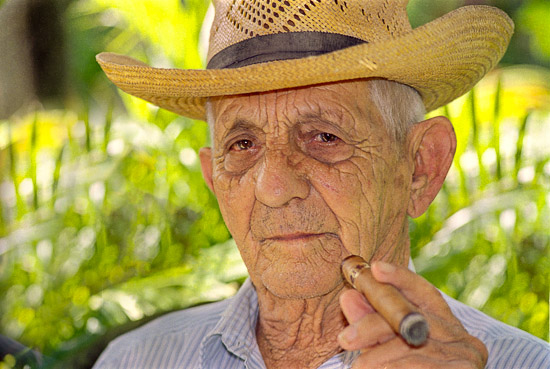
- Born: March 20, 1919; Alquízar, Cuba
- Died: April 17, 2010 (aged 91); San Luis, Pinar del Río, Cuba
- Occupation: tobacco grower

Alejandro Robaina (March 20, 1919 – April 17, 2010) was a Cuban tobacco grower, the namesake of the Vegas Robaina cigar brand.

== Biography ==
Robaina was born in Alquízar in La Habana Province of Cuba but he grew up and lived most of his life in the tobacco-growing Vuelta Abajo district of Pinar del Río Province where his family had been growing tobacco since 1845. He became involved with his family's tobacco growing business at the age of ten, having smoked his first cigar just shortly before then. He took over the operations of the plantation after the death of his father Maruto Robaina—also a tobacco grower—in 1950 and remained an independent grower even after the 1959 Cuban Revolution when plantations were often absorbed into cooperative organizations. In a 2006 interview with Cigar Aficionado magazine, Robaina stated that he spoke with Castro and that he "told Fidel I did not like cooperatives or state farms and that the best way to grow tobacco was through family production. He wanted me to join a cooperative and I told him no."

The tobacco leaves from Robaina's plantations are often considered among the best in the world and have been used by high quality cigars brands such as Cohiba and Hoyo de Monterrey. Robaina himself has been dubbed the "Godfather of Cuban tobacco."

During the 1990s, Robaina was recognized by the Cuban government as the country's best tobacco grower. In 1997, the Vegas Robaina cigar brand was created by the Cuban government-owned company Habanos S.A. to honour Robaina's accomplishments in the industry, although cigar experts have had a hard time detecting Robaina's tobacco in the cigar and Robaina himself never provided a definitive answer. Robaina is the only tobacco grower with a Cuban cigar named after himself and has spent several decades travelling the world as Cuba's unofficial tobacco and cigar ambassador. His travelling subsided as he got older and he received visits at his home and plantation by thousands of cigar enthusiasts and tourists annually.

Robaina was diagnosed with cancer in 2009 and died in his home on his tobacco plantation near San Luis, Pinar del Río. He handed over the majority of the day-to-day operations of the plantation to his grandson Hiroshi several years before his death.
