= Fonseca (cigar brand) =

Cigar brand

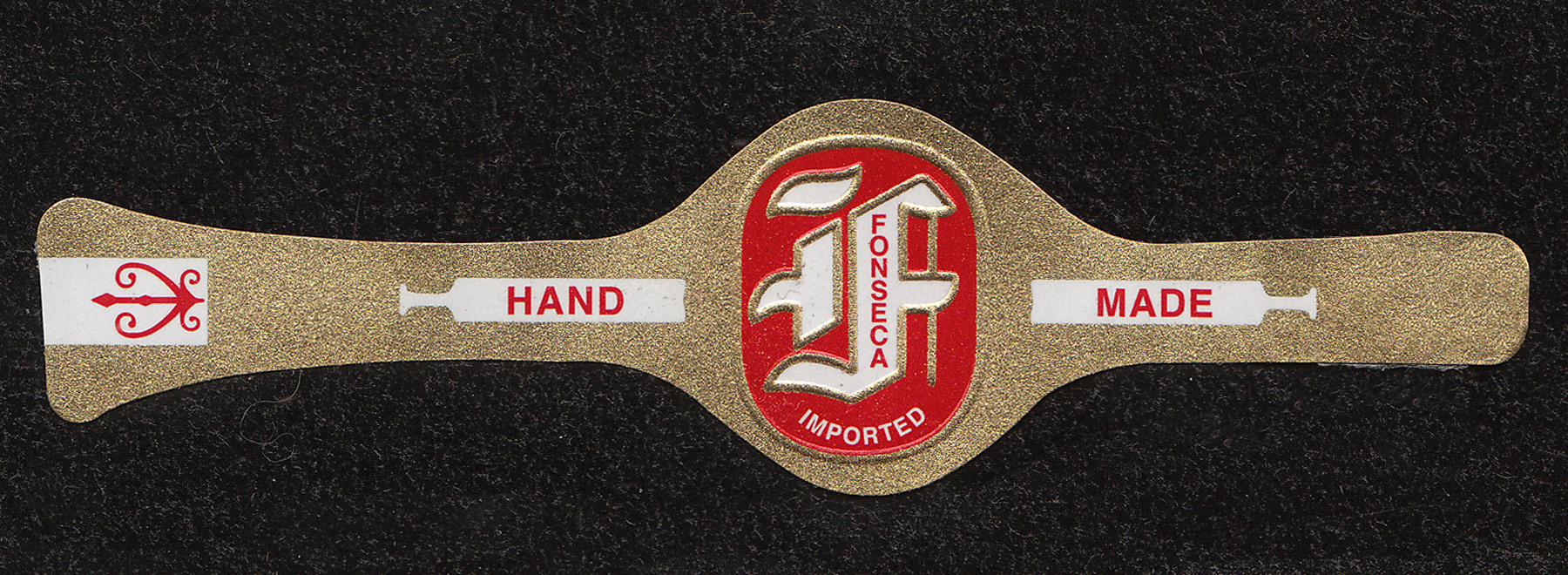
Fonseca logo

Don Francisco E. Fonseca

Fonseca is the name of two premium cigar brands, one produced in Cuba, and the other produced in Nicaragua for two different companies.

== History ==
Its founder, Don Francisco E. Fonseca was born in Manzanillo, Cuba, in 1868 (there are variations in birth years across documents). In 1892, he established both a factory and his cigar brand in Havana. He officially registered the brand under his name in 1907. Fonseca, accompanied by his wife Teresa Boetticher de Fonseca, later immigrated to New York. By 1903, Fonseca was overseeing a factory at 169 Front Street. He attained American citizenship in 1895.

Around 1905, the registry of cigar factories documented F.E. Fonseca & Co.'s presence at a new location: 129 Duane Street, situated in Tribeca. Meanwhile, Fonseca maintained a residence at 48 West 73rd Street in New York, where he and Teresa raised their four children, three of whom were named Francisco. Despite his residency in the United States, Fonseca regularly journeyed to Cuba to oversee his tobacco factory, "F.E. Fonseca. Fábrica de Tabacos y Cigarros." Fonseca cigars quickly became a success. Besides having a reputation for selecting the finest quality tobacco, Don Francisco developed an innovative method of packaging his cigars, wrapping each one separately in a tube of tin foil, and then an outer covering of fine Japanese paper, to shield the cigar from atmospheric changes (They are still packaged this way today, with the tubes now usually made of aluminum foil instead of tin). After Don Francisco's premature death of a heart attack in Havana in 1929, his wife Teresa continued the business and merged the brand with T. Castañeda and G. Montero to form the firm of Castañeda, Montero, Fonseca SA.

Production continued uninterrupted after the revolution and the cigars are still produced at the Lázaro Pena Factory in Havana. As a cigar brand, Fonseca is relatively mild by most aficionados' standards, sells for cheaper than most other Cuban cigar brands, and is marketed mostly in Spain and Canada, where the brand is particularly popular.

=== Vitolas in the Fonseca Line ===
The following list of Vitolas de Salida (commercial Vitolas) within the Fonseca marque lists their size and ring gauge in imperial (and metric), their "Vitolas de galera" (factory Vitolas), and their common name in American cigar slang. All are hand-made, long-filler cigars with the exception of the Delicias, which use short-filler tobacco.

Hand-Made Vitolas

- Cosaco - 5 3/8" × 42 (137 × 16.67 mm), Cosaco, a corona
- Delicia - 4 7/8" × 40 (124 × 15.88 mm), Standard, a petit corona
- No. 1 - 6 3/8" × 44 (162 × 17.46 mm), Cazador, a lonsdale
- KDT Cadete - 4 1/2" × 36 (114 × 14.29 mm), Cadete, a short panetela

== Cultural references ==
Spanish poet Federico García Lorca mentions the “blond head of Fonseca” (la rubia cabeza de Fonseca), along with “the pink of Romeo y Julieta” in his poem “Son de negros en Cuba” (Poet in New York).

== See also ==
- Cigar brands
