= Dannemann Cigars =

German Tobacco Producer

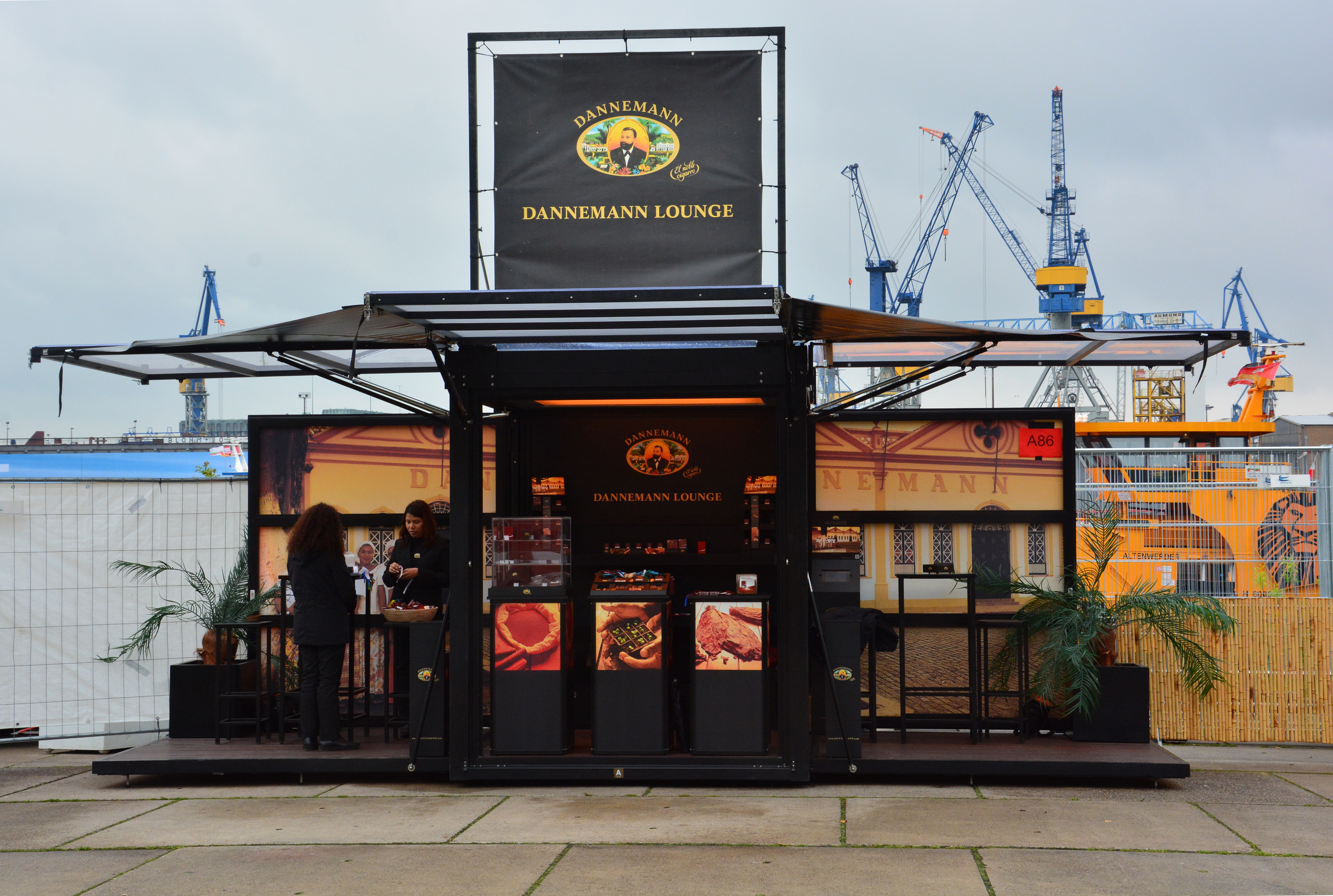
The Dannemann lounge at the Port of Hamburg anniversary celebration in 2014.

Dannemann Cigars (Dannemann Cigarrenfabrik in German) is a Swiss-owned, Germany-based cigar manufacturer originally founded by Gerhard Dannemann in 1873. He was born on 23 April 1851 in Bremen and died in 1921. A German-Brazilian entrepreneur and founder of the cigar company Dannemann, he later changed his name to Geraldo Dannemann. Dannemann also sells the cigarillo brand Moods.

== History ==
The company was founded by Bremen-born entrepreneur Geraldo Dannemann, who emigrated to Brazil in 1872. In 1873, he opened a cigar factory with six employees in São Félix.

In 1922, Dannemann merged with the Stender company to form Companhia de Charutos Dannemann.

The Second World War brought significant challenges, disrupting transatlantic trade due to economic embargoes. During this time, Dannemann's operations in Brazil were expropriated and managed by the Brazilian bank, Banco do Brasil.

After the war, Geraldo Dannemann regained possession of the company; however, in 1954, he filed for bankruptcy.

In 1994, the flavored cigarillo brand, Dannemann Moods, was launched.

During the transitional period, the brand was overseen by the Minden-based Melitta group of companies until it was sold to Liechtenstein. In 1988, the Swiss Burger Group bought the German trademark rights for Dannemann and took over Dannemann GmbH in Lübbecke.

Based on the Centro Cultural Dannemann in Bahia, Brazil, the Centro Dannemann was founded in Brissago, Switzerland at the beginning of 2002. The Centro Cultural Dannemann was established in Bahia, Brazil, which led to the founding of Centro Dannemann in Brissago, Switzerland, in the beginning of 2002.

The Dannemann Cigarrenfabrik GmbH is both a traditional European tobacco company and the current market leader in the field of cigarillos and cigars in Germany.

Dannemann factory workers engaged in a strike in 2023 due to then-ongoing wage negotiations. The cigar factory worker union NGG criticized the German Federal Association of the Cigar Industry (Bundesverband der Zigarrenindustrie) for offering only a 1.4% pay increase, which they deemed insufficient during a period of severe inflation in Germany. NGG had demanded a €450 monthly raise for about 1,500 employees working at cigar factories, including those at Dannemann in Lübbecke. In response, a 24-hour strike occurred on May 24, 2023. The union also sought to standardize contracts across the industry.

In 2023, the company began construction of a new production hall in Lübbecke, Germany. The facility, which became operational in January 2024, represents an investment in more modern and sustainable production capabilities.

== In popular culture ==
Dannemann cigars are mentioned in the opening line of the Cold Chisel song Cheap Wine.
