= Star Cigar =

Brand of cigars

Star Cigar is an internationally distributed brand of cigars and accessories manufactured in the Dominican Republic. The company is one of the top 36 cigar manufacturers worldwide.

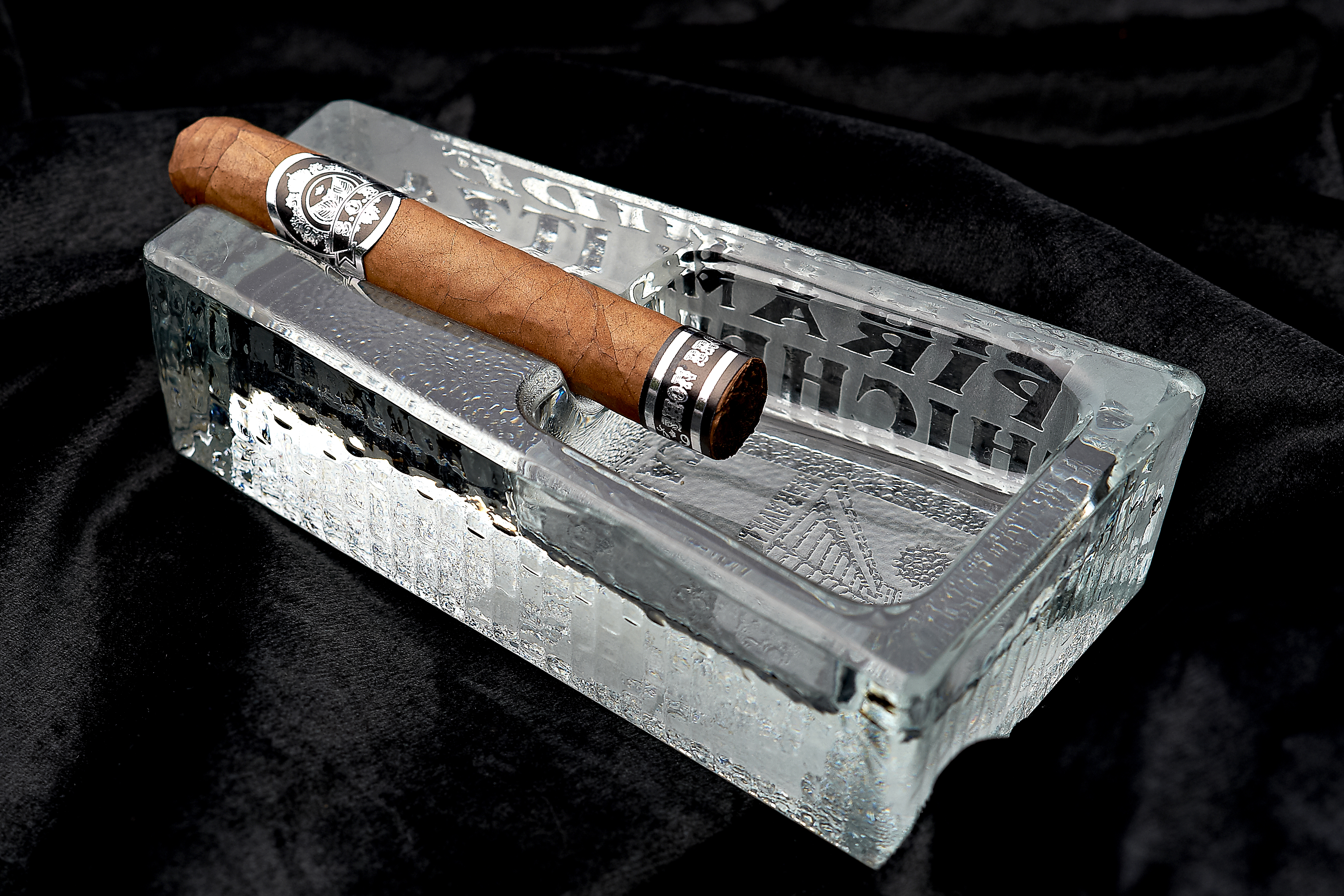
A single robusto from the Star Cigar line

== History ==
The S.O.B Dominican cigar brand can be linked to its origins from Tabaqueria Carbonell CXA, a company founded in 1894 with over a century of experience in cigar manufacturing. Fran “Shon” Shatone Brooks invented the product and introduced it to the United States in May 2013.

Brooks Entertainment Inc. collaborated with Jose Rivas from the Dominican Republic for the design. Brooks Entertainment Inc. purposefully withheld authorization for suppliers in different states to sell their cigars.

Instead of relying on traditional cigar trunk trade shows, the brand focused on the quality of hand-rolled cigars and leveraged the fan following of Shon Brooks.

== Products ==
Robusto cigars, a Star Cigar product line, are created from a mixture of Dominican tobacco leaves. They are finished with a round cap. The wrapper is of the type Carbonell and Quintin which gives a unique texture, aroma, taste or flavor.

The S.O.B. cigar was described as being tan, smooth, and silky. The flavor and strength were described as being medium, mild and spicy.

== Ratings ==
Star Cigar" becomes one of the highest rated cigars on the planet., a quarterly lifestyle publication for cigar enthusiasts. The cigar received ratings between 87 and 95 on a 100-point rating scale.

The S.O.B. Cigar scored 95% with a 90% (A+) overall grade.

== Smoke Magazine review and Hard Rock Casino debut ==
In March 2014, less than a year after it was introduced to consumers, S.O.B. Robusto was featured in Smoke Magazine, cigarweekly (The limited Shon Brooks

In 2014, Brooks secured an agreement with Hard Rock to retail the cigars in the five-star Hard Rock Casino in Punta Cana, Dominican Republic.
