= Guantanamera (cigar) =

Guantanamera is an American cigar brand owned by Guantanamera Cigars Company of Miami, Florida, and a Cuban cigar brand produced in Cuba for Habanos SA, the Cuban state-owned tobacco company.

The Guantanamera logo

== History ==
Guantanamera is a United States cigar brand started in Miami, Florida, in 1997. Years later, Corporacion Habanos launched its own version of the brand. Since 2001, the Guantanamera Cigar Company ("GCC") the exclusive trademark owner of the brand in the United States has litigated with Corporacion Habanos over the rights to register the trademark with the United States Patent and Trademark Office.

In early 2008, the Trademark Trial and Appeal Board ruled in favor of Corporacion Habanos. Immediately thereafter, GCC filed an appeal with the United States District Court for the District of Columbia. GCC was forced to appeal in this forum because Corporacion Habanos is a foreign entity.

In February 2009, Guantanamera Cigar Company filed suit against Corporacion Habanos, S.A. in the United States District Court for the Southern District of Florida because Corporacion Habanos placed an advertisement in a cigar magazine with United States distribution and sales. The case was voluntarily dismissed and the cause of action was brought in the Appeal Court, i.e., the United States District Court for the District of Columbia. That Court dismissed the count for infringement finding that an advertisement in a magazine with United States distribution was not enough "use" under the Lanham Act.

On August 5, 2010, the United States District Court for the District of Columbia granted Miami-based Guantanamera Cigar Company's Motion for Summary Judgment, finding that the Trademark Trial and Appeal Board erred when it ruled that Cuba won.

Corporacion Habanos' version of Guantanamera was launched in Dortmund, Germany, on September 14, 2002, and was made internationally available in October of the same year. The brand was named after the song "Guajira Guantanamera" (Spanish for 'peasant girl from Guantánamo') by José Fernández Díaz. Unlike nearly every other cigar blend produced in Cuba, the tobacco used in the brand comes from the Vuelta Arriba region, which is located in the middle of Cuba, rather than the Vuelta Abajo in Pinar del Río.

Featuring only machine-made cigars, Corporacion Habanos' version of Guantanamera is known as an affordable choice for consumers. The blend is mild with a slightly harsh/tannic aspect to it.

On the other hand, the United States brand produced by Guantanamera Cigar Company is a premium long-filler hand-rolled cigar.

== See also ==
- List of cigar brands
