= Perdomo (cigar brand) =

Nicaraguan-American cigar brand

Band from Perdomo Habano cigar.

Perdomo is a brand of cigars primarily grown and produced in Nicaragua and sold worldwide by Tabacalera Perdomo. Manufactured by Perdomo Cigars, the company is a family owned and operated business headquartered in Miami Lakes, Florida and headed by CEO Nick Perdomo, Jr.

== Company history ==
=== Forerunners ===
Tabacalera Perdomo traces its roots to the town of San Jose de las Lajas, Cuba, about 17 miles (27 km.) southeast of Havana, where company founder Silvio Perdomo was raised. Perdomo went into the cigar industry as a young man, serving his apprenticeship for Cuesta y Cia in the early 1930s. Silvio left that company's employ in 1937 to go to work for H. Upmann, where he remained until 1945. In 1945, Silvio Perdomo left H. Upmann to go to work in a managerial position at Partagas, where he stayed until 1959.

Silvio Perdomo's son, Nicholas Perdomo Sr. (Nick Senior), soon followed his father into the cigar making trade, beginning his apprenticeship in 1948 for Marin & Trujillo. Following the completion of his apprenticeship, Nick Senior joined his father as an executive at Partagas. He later began work as a top executive at the H. Upmann factory, the largest cigar manufacturing facility in Cuba.

Following the Cuban Revolution of 1959, Silvio Perdomo was arrested by revolutionaries and imprisoned at the Isla de los Pinos prison, where he was held for three years. He was then transferred to captivity at the La Cabana fortress overlooking Habana Bay. He spent the next 12 years in prison at La Cabana and four other facilities as an enemy of the revolution of Fidel Castro. Silvio emigrated to the United States in 1974.

Nick Senior was also targeted by revolutionaries. He later recalled "The political views of my family and I were very anti-communist, and President Fulgencio Batista used to visit the factories frequently. Batista didn't smoke cigars but, because it's one of Cuba's main exports, he was very interested in what my father and I were doing with the different cigar shapes and styles we were experimenting with." Nick Senior fought as a guerrilla against the communist forces during the revolution. He was shot twice in a firefight and later removed from the hospital on a gurney to escape summary execution.

After recovering through the aid of a friend, Nick Senior emigrated to the United States via the Uruguayan Embassy with the help of a sponsorship from the Catholic Church. His connection with the cigar manufacturing industry severed, Nick Senior settled near Washington, DC and resumed his life as an immigrant working as a janitor in a mental institution for $11 per week.

=== Establishment ===
In 1976, Nick Perdomo Sr. and his family, including son Nicholas Perdomo Jr. (Nick Junior), moved from the city in which they had lived, Baltimore, Maryland, to Miami, Florida to be closer to relatives. Nick Junior attended Hialeah High School before joining the U.S. Navy, in which he served as an air traffic controller. Following completion of his military stint, Nick Junior gained employment in the same field at Miami International Airport.

Nick Junior felt the urge to follow in the footsteps of his father and grandfather as a cigarmaker, despite his industry inexperience. In August 1992, he started a business based out of his garage, marking the beginning of today's Tabacalera Perdomo. The company in Miami was named "Nick's Cigar Co."

Nick Junior initially retained his well paying job as an air traffic controller and worked at his startup cigar brand in the evenings. In its initial phase, the company employed three rollers, with Nick Junior and his wife Janine working as packers. Nick Junior sought to reject the prevailing trend in the cigar industry, which was skewing towards mild cigars. He instead focused on making a product using wrappers from Ecuador and fillers from Central America, thus changing the flavor of the cigars. This decision proved to be a wise choice, as the flood of new cigar smokers in the 1990's developed tastes for spicier products.

In his first year, "Nick's Cigars" produced and sold just 9,400 cigars, but the business expanded rapidly. By 1997 he had reached the limits of production at his small Miami facility and a move was necessitated to Ybor City, near Tampa, a historic area for American cigarmaking. This facility proved unsatisfactory, however, due to the prohibitively high cost of production in the United States.

Perdomo also expanded production abroad during the cigar boom of the 1990s, with Nick Senior coming out of retirement in 1997 to help open a production facility in Estelí, Nicaragua. The company sold 1 million cigars in that year.

This facility proved to not have a large enough capacity to keep up and was replaced with a custom-built facility in the same city in 1999.

=== Development ===
Perdomo introduced the Perdomo² ("Perdomo squared") in the 1990s during the cigar boom, one of the first box-pressed cigars of the period.

In April 1999, Perdomo was approached by Cano A. Ozgener, head of C.A.O. International, with a proposition to produce its C.A.O. L'Anniversaire line, patterned after the legendary Partagas Serie D No. 4. Ozgener was in the process of losing his manufacturing plant, Tabacalera Tambor in Costa Rica, manufacturer of the Bahia brand and was in need of a new partner to keep his product in production and Perdomo was chosen over other potential partners. A mutually beneficial partnership resulted which aided in the expansion of the Perdomo operation.

By 2001, Tabacalera Perdomo employed 622 people in Central America as well as 24 in the United States, who were projected to make 10 million cigars for the year.

The company produces a wide range of handmade cigars ranging from entry-level bundled products to its flagship, the Perdomo Patriarch. Perdomo produces a wide array of products on behalf of other companies, including retailing giant Thompson & Co. and cigar distributor Philips and King, in addition to their own products.

=== Company today ===
Today Perdomo's manufacturing operation is based in an 88,000-square-foot (8,200 m^{2}) facility in Estelí, Nicaragua, known colloquially as "El Monstro" (The Monster). The building is the second-largest cigarmaking facility in Nicaragua, trailing only the factory of Nicaraguan American Tobaccos S.A. (NATSA), also located in Estelí. Headquarters are located in Miami Lakes, Florida.

Over 2,000 people were employed by the company in 2010, according to the company's website.

Nick Perdomo, Jr. remains as president and chief executive officer of Tabacalera Perdomo, while his wife, Janine Perdomo, serves as Vice President of Operations. The couple's son, Nicholas Perdomo III (born c. 1992), is being taught every aspect of the cigar making process from planting to packaging. Their daughter, Natalie (born c. 1995), graduated from the University of Alabama in 2017 and is working for the company now in marketing and advertising.

== Perdomo products ==
(active)

- PERDOMO 30TH ANNIVERSARY
- PERDOMO DOUBLE-AGED 12 YEAR VINTAGE
- PERDOMO 20TH ANNIVERSARY
- PERDOMO 10TH ANNIVERSARY
- PERDOMO HABANO BOURBON BARREL-AGED
- PERDOMO PERDOMO LOT 23
- PERDOMO INMENSO SEVENTY
- PERDOMO PERDOMO FRESCO

(inactive)

- Perdomo
- Perdomo Exhibicion
- Perdomo Small Batch Series
- Perdomo Factory Tour Blend
- Perdomo Special Craft Series
- Perdomo Estate Seleccion Vintage
- Perdomo Limited Cameroon Edition
- Perdomo² (squared)
- Perdomo Edición de Silvio
- Perdomo Gran Cru
- Perdomo Moments
- Perdomo Reserve Golf
- Cuban Bullet
- Dos Rios
- Genuine Cuban Counterfeits
- La Tradición Cabinet Series
- Nick's Sticks
- Tierra del Sol

== See also ==
- List of cigar brands
