= Gispert =

Cigar

Gispert (Spanish: [xispet]) is the name of two premium cigar brands, one previously manufactured in Cuba for Habanos S.A., the Cuban state-owned tobacco company, and the other in Honduras for the Franco-Spanish tobacco monopoly Altadis S.A., a division of Imperial Tobacco.

== History ==
Simón Veja Peláez began producing the Cuban Gispert cigar in the Pinar del Rio region of Cuba in 1940, using tobacco from the Vuelta Arriba. Initially, all vitolas (sizes) were handcrafted. Gispert cigars have generally been light-bodied and low in strength when compared to most Cuban brands.

Following the 1959 Cuban Revolution, production of the Gispert brand was continued, first by Cubatabaco and then by Habanos S.A. at the Carlos Balio factory, which also produced the El Rey del Mundo brand. Sales declined over time, and by 1993, the original line of eleven vitolas launched in 1972 had been reduced to a few machine-made and hand-finished, machine-made sizes.

By 2003, the brand accounted for approximately 0.1 percent of Habanos S.A.'s total cigar exports, and only one vitola remained in production, the Habaneros No. 2. Habanos S.A. withdrew the Gispert brand entirely in 2005.

Altadis began manufacturing of a new Gispert cigar in Honduras in 2003 to reintroduce the historic Cuban brand. It is made in two versions at the La Flor de Copan Cigar Factory in Honduras, with either an Ecuador-grown Connecticut-seed wrapper or a maduro wrapper from San Andrés, Mexico, and a blend of Honduran and Nicaraguan filler tobacco. It has a mild-to-medium body.

== Vitolas in the Cuban Gispert line ==
The following list of vitolas de salida (commercial vitolas) within the Gispert marque lists their size and ring gauge in Imperial (and Metric), their vitolas de galera (factory vitolas), and their common name in American cigar slang.

- Cenadores Ones - 5 3/8" × 44 (137 × 17.46 mm)
- Coronas - 5 1/2" x 42 (142 x 16.67 mm) a Corona
- Coronas Grandes - 5 5/8" x 44 (143 17.46 mm) a Gran Corona
- Habaneros No. 2 - 4 13/16" x 40 (123 x 15.87 mm)
- Petit Coronas de Luxe - 5 1/16" x 42 (129 x 16.67 mm) a petit corona
