= Rocky Patel Premium Cigars =

American company

Coordinates: 26°19′21.3″N 81°46′19.3″W

The Rocky Patel Premium Cigar Company is a manufacturer of cigars, founded by Rakesh "Rocky" Patel and based in Bonita Springs, Florida.

== History ==
The company was founded in 1995 as Indian Tabac Cigar Co. by Hollywood attorney Rakesh "Rocky" Patel, who became interested in cigars when spending time with actors between takes, and sold his legal practice to start the business. It was named under license for the Indian Motorcycle and began in California in partnership with Phillip Zanghi III, who ran the company's growing and manufacturing operations in Honduras. The company later moved to Naples, Florida, and was renamed to Rocky Patel Premium Cigars in 2006. The Indian Tabac brand was discontinued in 2014.

Initially run entirely by Rocky Patel, since 2013 the company has been co-managed by his brother Nish Patel, who heads sales and major client relations, and his cousin Nimish Desai, who is head of production. As of 2015, it was based in Bonita Springs.

In the early 2000s, the Indian Tabac Cameroon Legend Gorilla was one of the largest cigars available, and its size was emulated by other producers. In 2008 the Rocky Patel Decade cigar, produced to mark the tenth year of the business, achieved a classic 95 rating in Cigar Aficionado.

In 2010, Patel opened a cigar and drinking lounge in Naples called Burn by Rocky Patel; in 2018 and 2019, other lounges opened in Pittsburgh, Oklahoma City, Indianapolis, and Atlanta. In 2020 the Naples lounge hosted one of the preliminaries for the Cigar Smoking World Championships.

From 2020 to 2024 Rocky Patel was the official cigar of the Cigar Smoking World Championships.

== Production ==
The cigars were initially all produced from tobacco grown in El Paraíso, Honduras, leased from Nestor Plasencia; Patel later expanded production to Nicaragua, where he began growing in Estelí with Amilcar Perez Castro and the company built a factory.

== See also ==
- List of cigar brands
