= Cigar band =

Loop of paper or foil that surrounds a cigar

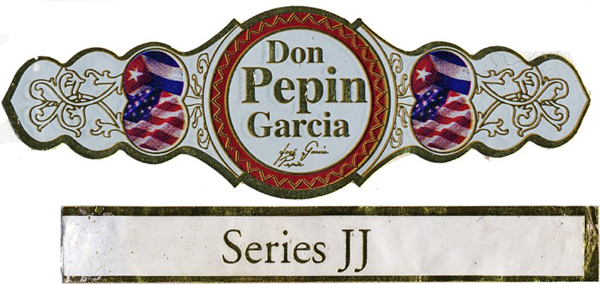
A cigar band

A cigar band is a loop made of paper or foil fitted around the body of a cigar to denote its brand or variety. Although origins of the device are the subject of several legends, modern historians credit a European immigrant to Cuba named Gustave Bock with invention of the cigar band in the 1830s. Within two decades, banding of cigars exported from Havana became almost universal.

Their use remains very much a part of modern cigar production, with a recent trend towards larger and more elaborate designs in evidence. Cigar bands are considered a collectible by some people today, with collectors organized into a group called the International Label, Seal and Cigar Band Society.

== History ==
=== Origins ===
The origin of the use of cigar bands is steeped in myth. One legend has it that Russian Tsaritsa Catherine the Great took cigars wrapped in silk so as not to stain her fingers, with members of her court beginning to wrap cigars in fabric bands in emulation of the queen. Similarly, tales have been told of paper bands used on cigars exported to England to prevent the staining of gentlemen's white gloves.

These fanciful theories aside, cigar historians credit Dutch-born cigarmaker Gustave Bock with the invention of the cigar band in the 1830s, when he ordered paper rings with his signature on them placed on every cigar intended for export to Europe. In this way, an indication of quality and prestige would be lent to Bock's products, he believed. By the middle of the 1850s, virtually all Cuban cigarmakers were banding their exported cigars, registering their marks with the government and urging consumers to insist on banded products.

=== Heyday of cigars ===
At the turn of the 20th century an estimated four out of five American men smoked cigars, with production in hundreds of factories. Product differentiation became very important in the fiercely competitive marketplace as makers struggled to win and keep market share. With the cost of production of cigar bands approximately 70 cents per thousand, the use of colorful maker's marks became an important tool for building brand identities. Historians estimate that approximately 2 billion cigar bands were sold in the United States in the year 1900 alone.

=== Band production ===
With advances in printing technology, cigar bands became brighter and more pictorial as the 19th century drew to a close. The bands and box art printed from 1890 to 1920 are today considered to be a product of the "Golden Age" of cigar-related artwork.

Cigar bands in the early 20th century were precut by the printer and generally were shipped in bundles of 100. Bands were applied by hand as one of the final stages of the production process, with the cigarmaker generally backing the band with a dab of plant-based glue to hold it in place on the finished cigar. Bands produced in Europe were typically carefully designed to match packaging motifs, while in the United States many bands bore a resemblance to the boxes or inner paper in which they were packaged.

Cigar bands were also used as a primitive form of trading stamps by some cigarmakers of the early 20th century, with at least one company producing an illustrated catalog replete with premiums which could be received in exchange for dozens, hundreds, or thousands of its bands.

From the 1920s through much of the 20th century cigar bands tended to become more utilitarian, owing to the spread of low cost four-color printing and the growth of cigarettes, which dramatically reduced the number of cigar manufacturers and their need for brand differentiation.

== Collectibility ==
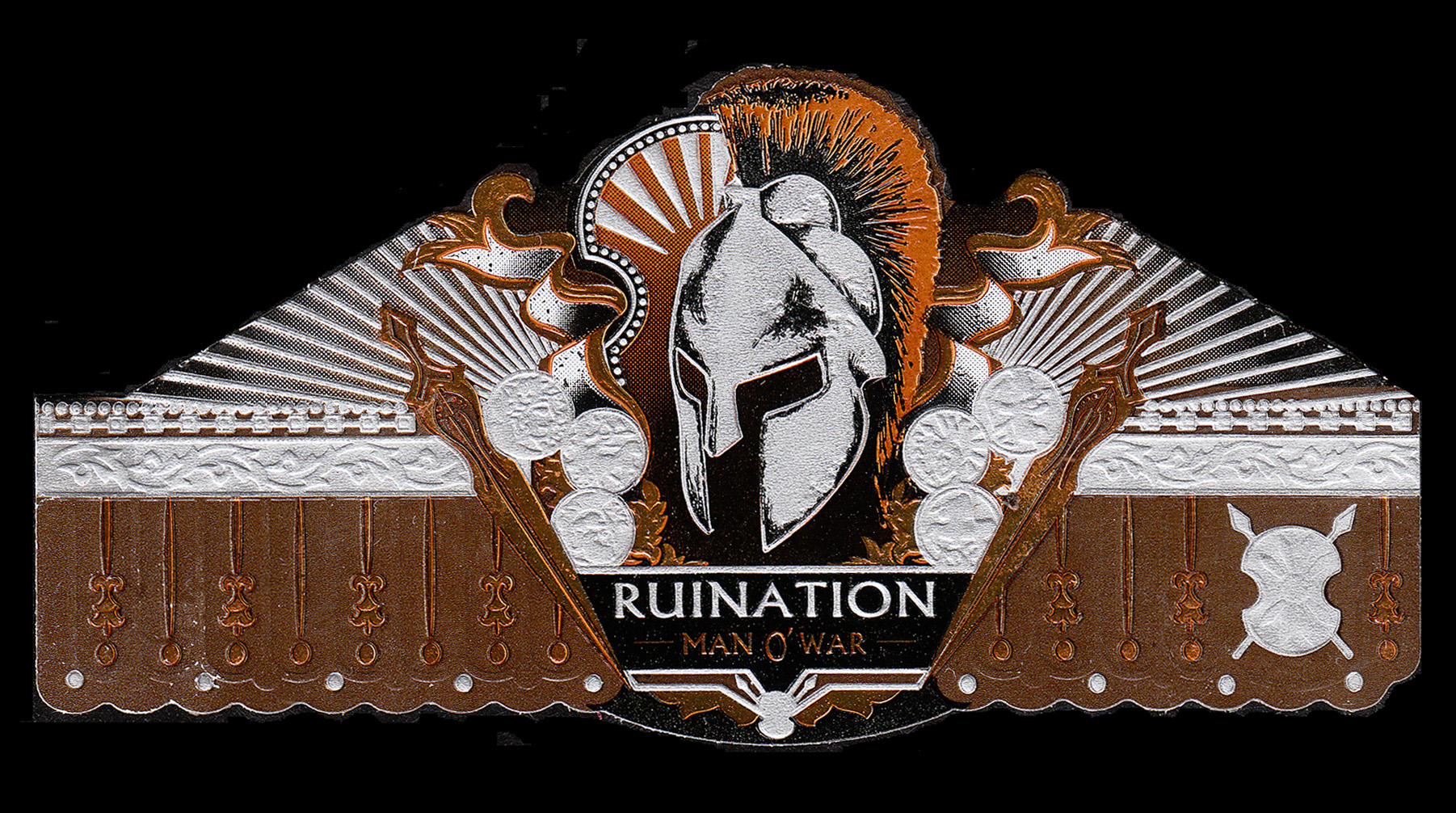
Recent years have seen a trend towards larger and more elaborate cigar band art.

Cigar bands were sometimes collected by children during the so-called "Golden Age" of cigar art due to their varied and colorful nature and their ready availability. The bright bands were sometimes collected and combined into collage art by scrapbookers, surviving specimens of which are eagerly sought today by collectors of folk art.

Vintage and modern cigar bands are collected today, with collectors joined into an organization called the International Label, Seal and Cigar Band Society. The largest collection of bands was accumulated by American collector Joe Hruby, listed in the Guinness Book of World Records for a collection of over 165,000 distinct varieties of bands—although that number had ballooned to over 221,000 varieties by 1999.

Cigar band collecting is called vitolphilia.

== Removal ==
The matter of whether to leave a cigar band on while the cigar is being smoked is a matter of some debate. In Great Britain, bands have been traditionally removed, the retention of the brand names being commonly considered a form of impolite boasting by one smoker amongst his fellows. Elsewhere, whether or not one retains the band while the cigar is being smoked is deemed a matter of personal preference.

Removal of the band is sometimes difficult when a cigar is freshly lit, although in short order the heat of the smoke generally loosens any adhesive glue impeding the band's removal.

== See also ==
- Cigar
- List of cigar brands
