= Nestor Plasencia =

Cuban-American tobacco grower and cigar maker

Nestor Plasencia Sr.
- Born: October 8, 1949 (age 76); Cuba
- Occupation: Tobacco grower
- Known for: Leading figure in the Central American cigar industry.

Nestor Plasencia Sr. (born October 8, 1949) is a tobacco grower and cigar maker of Cuban descent whose factories in Honduras and Nicaragua produce over 30 million cigars a year. Contracting out the use of his factories to Rocky Patel and other leading brands, Plasencia remains one of the leading figures in the Central American cigar industry.

== Early years ==
Nestor Plasencia Sr. was born in October 8, 1949 in Cuba to a tobacco growing family which emigrated after the Cuban Revolution of 1959.

== Career ==
=== After the revolution ===
The Plasencia family remained closely involved in the tobacco industry in Central America, with Nestor's uncle Herminio Plasencia continuing to be active in day-to-day operations in growing operations into the 1990s.

During the early 1980s, Plasencia lost his tobacco farms and factories in Nicaragua as a result of the Sandinista revolution. During this interval he moved his focus across the border to neighboring Honduras.

Nestor Plasencia in the early 1990s again operates two factories in Nicaragua — a 24,000-square-foot (2,200 m^{2}) unit opened in 1992 in the town of Ocotal and a smaller building in the country's cigar capital, Estelí. Plasencia's primary operations remain in Honduras, however, centered in two buildings in Danlí and smaller units in the villages of El Paraíso and Morocelí.

Plasencia is closely associated with the cigar-making Oliva family, with Cuban émigré Gilberto Oliva Sr. having served as manager of Plasencia's Moroceli factory, opened in 1991.

The output of Plasencia's factories experienced steady growth from 1 million cigars in 1986 to approximately 33 million just ten years later. The Plasencia factories are responsible for the manufacture of cigars for 30 or more labels, including products for J.R. Tobacco, Swisher International, and Rocky Patel.

During the middle 1990s, about 70 percent of the tobacco used in Plasencia-made cigars came from his own Honduran and Nicaraguan fields, with the remainder purchased on the market. Both Connecticut-seed and Cuban-seed is used in Plasencia's fields.

== Recognition ==
By 2010, Plasencia was regarded by many as "one of the foremost tobacco experts in the world." In 2000 he told Smoke magazine:

"Anyone who tells you they know everything there is to know about tobacco is either a liar or a fool. There are so many variables, so much is left to nature, that we can’t know or control everything. But we must control what we can to the best of our abilities."

== Family ==
Nestor Plasencia Sr.'s American-educated sons, Nestor Jr. and Jose Luis became actively involved in the family business.

== Some cigars made by Plasencia ==
- Crux Cigar Company
- Bonacquisti Cigars: "Bonacquisti" (Seven Traditional Sizes) and "Empire" (Sun Grown Nicaragua and Shade Grown Honduras)
- 262 Revere
- Jesus Fuego
- 5 Vegas: Classic, Gold, Gold Maduro, Cask Strength
- Alec Bradley: Harvest 97, Maxx, Nica Puro, American Sun Grown, American Classic Blend, Black Market
- Casa Magna
- Cu Avana: Intenso
- Cuba Libre
- Gurkha: Avenger G5
- El Mejor: Emerald, Espresso
- Line of Duty
- Nestor: Reserve
- Padilla: Obsidian
- Rocky Patel: Connecticut, Decade, Edge, Sun Grown, Renaissance
- Thomas Hinds Honduran Selection
- Villiger: 125, Colorado, Selecto, Talanga
- Wilson Adams Cigars: Habano, Sumatra, Mr. Wilson
- Total Flame: 8ball
