= H. Upmann =

Brand of Cuban cigars

- Product type: Cigar
- Current owner: Altadis, U.S.A
- Produced by: Habanos S.A. Altadis
- Country: Cuba
- Introduced: 1843; 183 years ago

H. Upmann is a Cuban brand of premium cigars established by banker Hermann Dietrich Upmann (who also founded the H. Upmann & Co. bank on the island). The brand is currently owned by a British corporation, Imperial Brands. The cigars are manufactured by Habanos S.A., the state-owned tobacco company in Cuba, and Altadis in La Romana, Dominican Republic.

== History ==
=== Establishment ===
A glass jar humidor of H. Upmann Arcadias Claro, believed to be pre-embargo

H. Upmann is among the oldest cigar brands in existence. In 1843, banker Hermann Dietrich Upmann (16 May 1816 – 1894) arrived in Havana, Cuba, to arrange business affairs for the firm of Gravenhorst & Co., an importing and exporting firm located in Bremen, Germany. Seeing the potential for further importing opportunities, Upmann purchased a local cigar factory. The factory, located at 85 San Miguel Street, Havana, began producing cigars under the H. Upmann brand in 1844. At the same time, he began a banking business, initially catering to tobacco dealers and manufacturers.

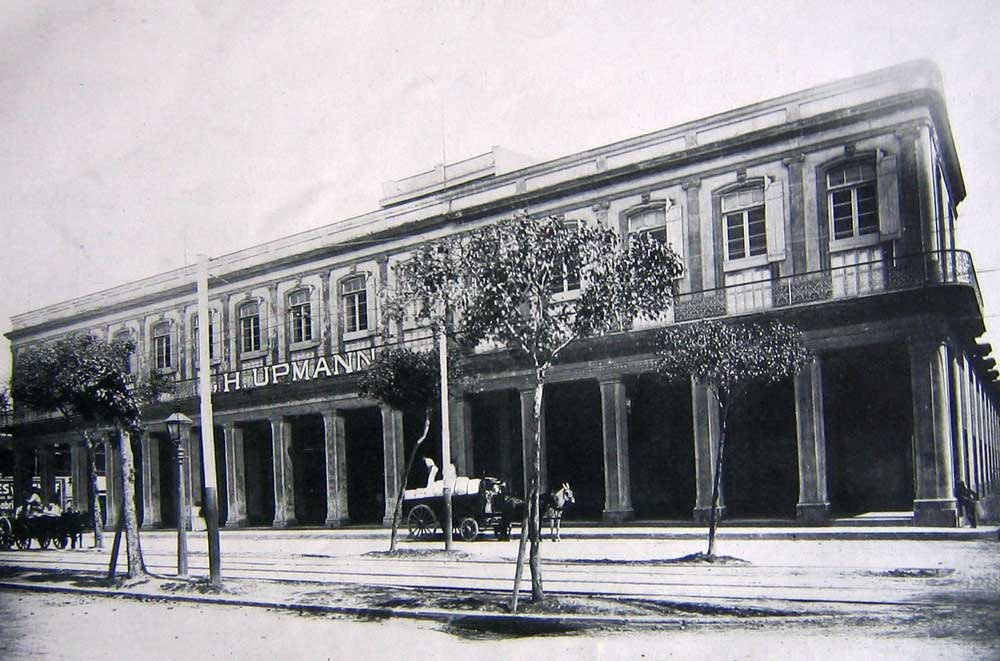
H. Upmann had a tobacco factory on Avenida Carlos III called "La Madama."

Hermann Upmann retired in 1890, and was succeeded by his nephew, Heinrich Upmann, who continued operating the business with his partners Heinrich Runken and Theodore Garbade, until his death in 1914. Heinrich Upmann was in turn succeeded by Hermann and Albert (Alberto) Upmann, nephews of Heinrich. By 1900, H. Upmann cigar manufacturing had moved to a large building located at 159-169 Paseo de Tacón (later renamed Avenida Carlos III) in Havana, sited between Calle Belascoin and Avenida Carlos III (Tercero). The H. Upmann Bank was at Calle Mercaderes Amargura 1–3 in Havana.

Upmann is sometimes credited with the invention of packaging cigars in cedar boxes to give to their customers. These original boxes were labelled with the H. Upmann name and contained other manufacturers' cigars, most likely as an advertisement for the operation, until the Upmanns bought their own cigar factory in 1844: the famous H. Upmann Factory, now known as the José Martí Factory, in Havana.

Through the late 1800s, the H. Upmann brand gained international recognition at various exhibitions and won seven gold medals which still carry the lithographed art on today's H. Upmann boxes, along with Hermann Upmann's original signature. In North America, Charles Landau became the exclusive agent for H. Upmann cigars for many years.

=== Spy network ===
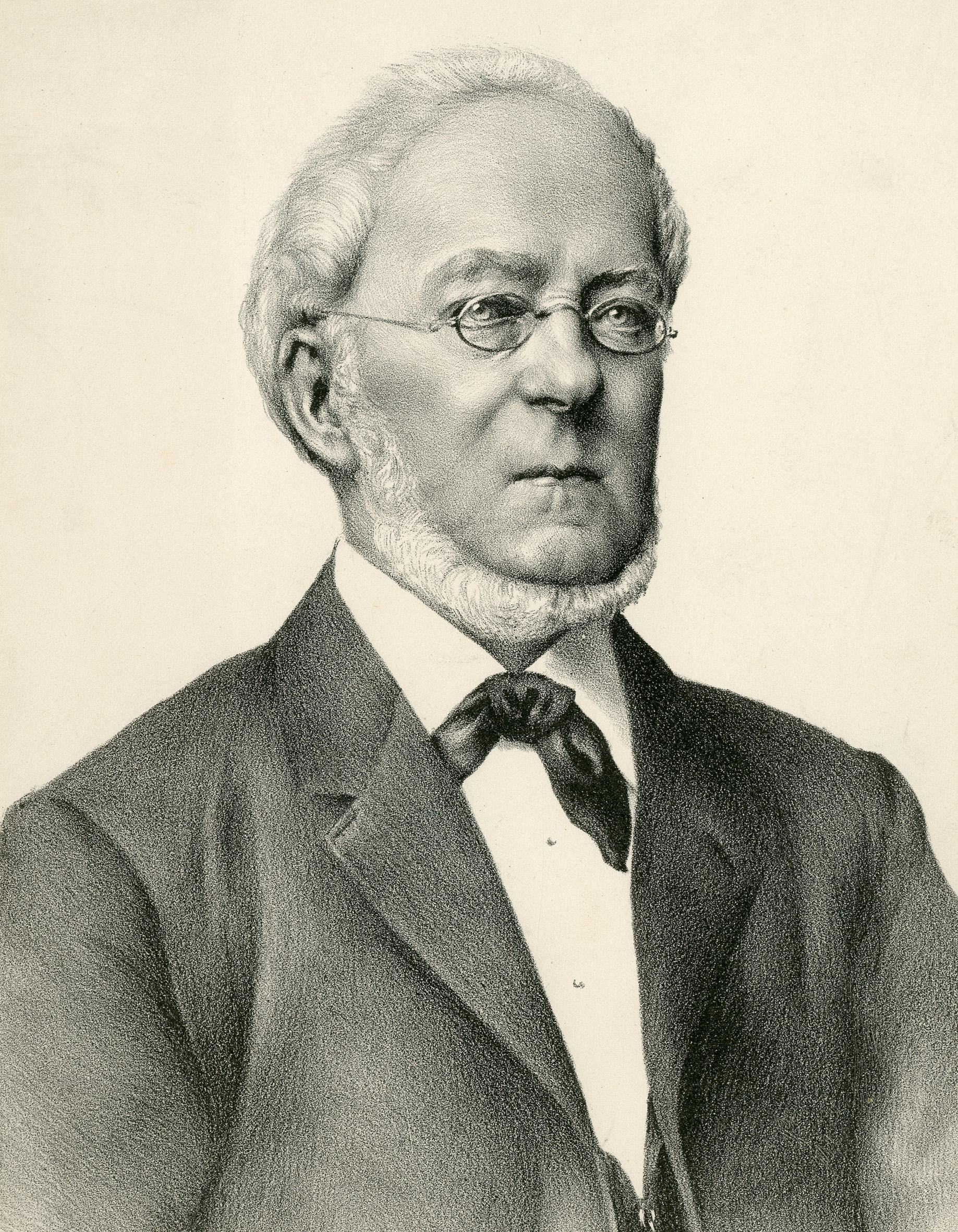
H. Upmann, founder of the company, and uncle of Heinrich Upmann.

At the outbreak of World War I, Hermann and Albert Upmann used their business interests in Cuba and the US to conceal their operation of a German intelligence network. The Upmanns and their agents were suspected of fomenting revolts in Haiti in 1916 and the Dominican Republic in 1916, and of providing arms and assistance to Cuban General Jose Miguel Gómez in his attempted coup against President Mario Garcia Menocal after the Cuban Presidential Elections of 1916. The H. Upmann Bank building on Calle Mercaderes was regularly used as a stopover point by German agents traveling between Mexico and Europe.

After the Cuban government declared war on Germany on 7 April 1917, the H. Upmann bank was closed for thirty consecutive months. On 5 December 1917, the H. Upmann company was named to the very first U.S. Enemy Trading List of foreign companies with whom U.S. banks and companies were forbidden to trade, while Hermann and Alberto Upmann were both named individually as to the list on 26 July 1918 and 4 October 1918, respectively. At the same time, the U.S. Alien Property Custodian seized H. Upmann Bank's U.S. based assets, which were transferred to U.S. owners. Hermann and Alberto Upmann were interned by the Cuban government on 16 October 1918, just a month before the Armistice. While 24 other German nationals languished in La Cabaña prison, the Upmanns were placed under house arrest. After their release, Hermann Upmann traveled to the U.S. and retained a law firm to claim the monetary value of H. Upmann assets during the war. Although Upmann received a settlement from the U.S. Alien Property Custodian in March 1920, the amount left over after payment of attorney fees and expenses proved insufficient to cover the bank's other expenses, such as paying employee salaries and maintenance costs incurred during the period of the bank's closure by the Cuban government.

=== Bankruptcy and re-emergence ===
In 1917, H. Upmann's U.S.-based property and asset investments were seized by the Custodian of Alien Enemy properties, and the firm was placed on the U.S. Enemy Trading List. To compensate for the loss of these assets and the suspension of bank operations, Hermann Upmann had invested heavily in speculative currency investments and Mexican oil properties, using funds obtained from depositor assets without the consent of the depositors. After a rumored attempt to escape Cuba by airplane, on 1 May 1922, Hermann and Albert Upmann were arrested and charged with bank fraud by the Cuban Attorney General, after bank examiners discovered that US$2,000,000 in depositor securities had been fraudulently sold or transferred. While in jail, Albert Upmann claimed he had no knowledge of the firm's banking activities, stating that he had confined himself to management of the firm's tobacco manufacturing operation. Both brothers eventually relinquished their personal balances and claims with the firm for the benefit of creditors, and fraud charges were dropped against Albert Upmann, who later moved to the USA. Hermann Upmann was later released on $100,000 bail, and criminal charges were dropped in October 1922. Although Hermann Upmann lost most of his fortune and his position as an influential Cuban financier and businessman, he managed to save a few of his properties after collapse of the H. Upmann bank. He died in Havana on 3 September 1925.

By May 1922, both the H. Upmann Bank and the Upmann cigar operation were in bankruptcy. That same year, J. Frankau & Co, one of H. Upmann's licensed agents for the United Kingdom, bought the H. Upmann cigar brand and factory at auction for 30,000 Cuban pesos, and after a three-year negotiation with Upmann creditors, managed to restore cigar production under the H. Upmann brand. In 1935, J. Frankau was purchased by J. R. Freeman & Son, who found it difficult to manage a Cuban cigar company from London. In 1937, the company was sold to the recently established Menéndez, García y Cía Co., makers of the Montecristo brand. J. Frankau retained the rights to H. Upmann in the UK as part of the deal. Menéndez y Ciz continued production of H. Upmann cigars until the nationalization of the tobacco industry after the Cuban Revolution on 15 September 1960.

The night before US President John F. Kennedy signed the Cuban embargo, he had aide Pierre Salinger procure every box he could gather from Washington, D.C. tobacconists, totalling 1,200 cigars.

=== Post-Cuban Revolution ===
After the revolution, Menéndez and García moved the brand first to the Canary Islands, then the Dominican Republic, where production continues under the ownership of Imperial Tobacco. Cuban-produced H. Upmann cigars are produced in Havana for the Cuban state-owned organization Habanos SA (formerly Cubatabaco). Cuban H. Upmann cigars are hand-rolled in the original H. Upmann (since renamed José Martí) factory, using tobacco from the premium Vuelta Abajo region.

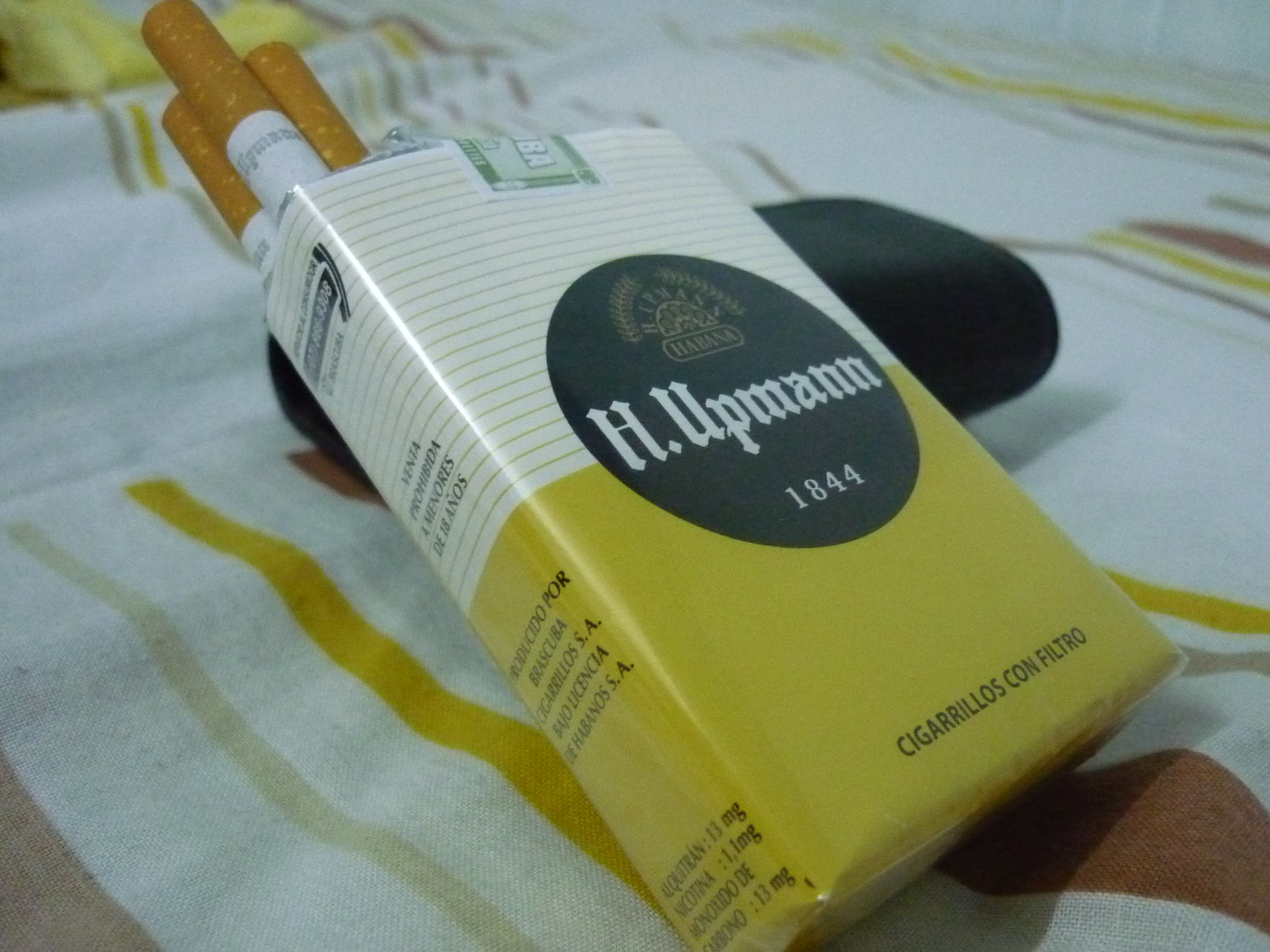
H. Upmann branded cigarettes

The Cuban-made brand still remains a cigar on the world market, where it is made in hand-made vitolas. Machine-made cigars were discontinued in 2002. That same year, when Altadis SA bought a controlling share in Habanos SA, numerous changes were made to the H. Upmann lineup, with the vast array of more than 30 vitolas rationalized so that redundant and poor selling sizes were eliminated. By 2006, according to the company, the H. Upmann line had been whittled down to just 16 vitolas.

In 2005, Habanos SA offered a new H. Upmann as part of their annual Edición Limitada release. In the past, the limited edition releases had only been produced for their five globally distributed brands (Cohíba, Montecristo, Romeo y Julieta, Partagás and Hoyo de Monterrey), whereas the non-Cuban H. Upmann was a locally distributed brand. The limited edition size was a large Magnum 50. Shortly after, Quintero was demoted to a locally distributed brand in the Habanos portfolio, while H. Upmann was raised to a global brand with distribution in every nation that imports Habanos cigars.

H. Upmann also produces two machine-made cigarillos (the Mini and the Purito) and a brand of cigarettes under the direction of ICT.

== Cuban H. Upmann Vitolas ==
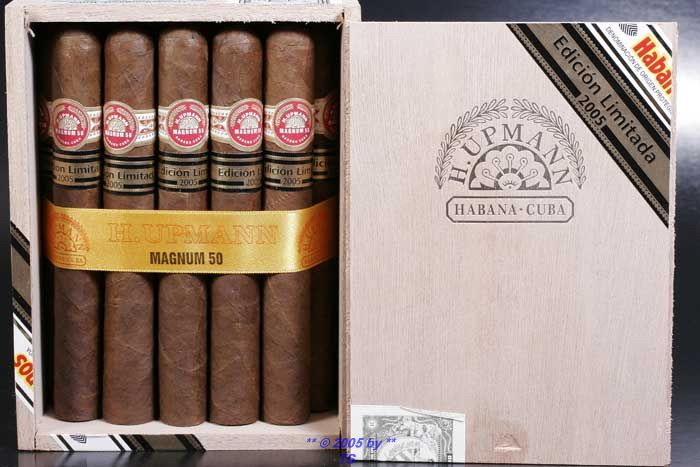
A cabinet of H. Upmann Magnum 50 cigars

A double guillotine-style cutter, used for cutting the tip off a cigar, next to two hand-rolled H. Upmann Coronas Major cigars, one inside its storage tube and one outside.

The following list of handmade vitolas de salida (commercial vitolas) within the H. Upmann marque lists in order, their length in Imperial (and Metric), ring gauge, their Factory name, a colloquial description of size/shape, (release date and current manufacture):

- Half Corona - 3.5" (90 mm) x 44. Corona, a petit corona (a 2011 release. Current)
- Epicure - 4.3" (110 mm) × 35. Epicures, a short panetela (a pre-1960 release. Current)
- Corona Junior - 4.5" (115 mm) × 36. Cadetes, a short panetela (a pre-1960 release. Current)
- Corona Minor - 4.6" (117 mm) x 40. Coronitas, a petit corona (a pre-1960 release. Current)
- Robusto - 4.8" (122 mm) x 50. Robustos, a robusto (a 2007 release. Current)
- Connoisseur No. 1 - 5" (127 mm) × 48. Hermosos No.4, a corona extra (a pre-1960 release. Current)
- Petit Corona - 5.1" (129 mm) × 42. Marevas, a petit corona (a pre-1960 release. Current)
- Regalias - 5.1" (129 mm) × 42. Petit Coronas, a petit corona (a pre-1960 release. Current)
- Corona Major - 5.2" (132 mm) × 42. EmEminences, a corona (a pre-1960 release. Current)
- Majestic - 5.5" (140 mm) × 40. Cremas, a corona (a pre-1960 release. Current)
- Connoisseur A - 5.5" (140 mm) x 52. Genios, a corona (a 2013 release. Current)
- Magnum 46 - 5.6" (143 mm) × 46. Corona Gordas, a grand corona (a pre-1960 release. Current)
- Upmann No. 2 - 6.1" (156 mm) × 52. Pirámides, a pyramid (a pre-1960 release. Current)
- Magnum 50 - 6.3" (160 mm) × 50. Double Robustos, a double robusto (a 2008 release. Current)
- Monarcas - 7" (178 mm) × 47. Julieta No.2, a Churchill (a pre-1960 release. Discontinued 2009, but still available)
- Sir Winston - 7" (178 mm) × 47. Julieta No.2, a Churchill (a pre-1960 release. Current)

=== Edición Limitada ===
- Magnum 50 - 6.3" (160 mm) × 50. Magnum 50, a double robusto (a 2005 release. Current but limited)
- Magnum 48 - 4.3" (110 mm) × 48. Magnum 48, a petit robusto (a 2009 release. Current but limited)
- Robusto - 4.8" (122 mm) x 50. Robustos, a robusto (a 2012 release. Current but limited)
- Magnum 56 - 5.9" (150 mm) × 56. Magnum 56, a double robusto (a 2015 release. Current but limited)

== Dominican H. Upmann Vitolas ==
=== 1844 Reserve ===
- Demitasse -- 4-1/2" × 33.
- Corona -- 5-1/2" × 44
- Robusto -- 5" × 50.
- Churchill -- 7" × 50.
- Belicoso -- 6-1/8" × 52 (a Torpedo)
- Toro -- 6" × 54.
- Titan -- 6" × 60.

=== Legacy ===
- Corona -- 5-1/2" × 44.
- Toro -- 6" × 52.
- Robusto -- 5" × 54.
- Churchill -- 7" × 54.
- Magnum -- 6" × 60.

=== Vintage Cameroon ===
- Petite Corona -- 5" ×40.
- Corona -- 5-1/2" × 44.
- Lonsdale -- 6-5/8" × 44.
- Churchill -- 7" × 50.
- Robusto -- 5" × 52.
- Belicoso -- 6-1/8" x 52 (a Torpedo).
- Toro -- 6" × 54.

=== Reserve Maduro ===
- Robusto -- 5" × 54.
- Toro -- 6" × 54.
- Titan -- 6" × 60.

=== The Banker ===
- Currency -- 5-1/2" × 48 (Corona).
- Annuity -- 6" × 52 (Toro).
- Private Holding Ingot -- 6" × 54 (Toro) (A different blend from the rest of the Banker line)
- Arbitrage -- 7" × 56 (Churchill).

== See also ==
- List of cigar brands

== Bibliography ==
- Min Ron Nee and Adriano Martínez Rius, An Illustrated Encyclopaedia of Post-Revolution Havana Cigars. Hong Kong: Interpro Business Corporation, 2003.
