= Dunhill (cigar) =

Brand of cigar

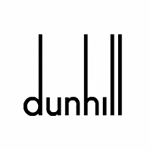
The Dunhill logo

The term Dunhill cigar refers to a Cuban-made cigar produced for and offered by Alfred Dunhill of London under its own varying brand names spanning several eras, as well as special lines made up of cigars produced by prestigious Cuban makers offered only by Dunhill.

The first Dunhill branded cigars were its Selección Supremas of the early 20th century, a line with various sizes made by Cuban cigar makers such as Montecristo and Romeo y Julieta. Dunhill also offered brands such as Don Cándido.

After the Cuban Revolution, Dunhill was given the exclusive rights to three Cuban brands by the government-owned tobacco monopoly, Cubatabaco: Don Cándido, its own Don Alfredo, and La Flor del Punto, plus the numerous Selección Suprema sizes produced by the Cuban marques that had survived nationalization.

A line under the Dunhill name was produced for Dunhill from 1982 until 1991. Later, Dunhill sold the right to put its name on cigars not made for or sold by it to British American Tobacco.

== History ==
In 1907, Alfred Dunhill opened his first tobacco shop on Duke Street, London. Before the Cuban Revolution, Dunhill had numerous distribution and marketing agreements with several Cuban cigar manufacturers, selling brands such as Don Cándido and Dunhill's own Selección Suprema line, with various sizes from cigar makers such as Montecristo and Romeo y Julieta. Dunhill became famous as the tobacconist of choice for George VI and Winston Churchill.

After the Cuban Revolution, the government's tobacco monopoly, Cubatabaco, gave Dunhill exclusive rights to three brands: Don Cándido, its own Don Alfredo, and La Flor del Punto, plus the numerous Selección Suprema sizes produced by the marques that had survived nationalization.

In 1967, the tobacco branch of Alfred Dunhill Ltd. was sold off and became its own separate entity. In 1981, tobacco blending of the Dunhill pipe tobaccos was transferred to Murrays, of Belfast. In 2005, it was transferred to Orlik of Denmark.

== Cigars ==
=== Don Cándido ===
Don Cándido cigars were created in 1935 by Cándido Vega Díaz, meant to be a premium version of the El Rey del Mundo brand Vega already owned for distribution exclusively by Dunhill. They were produced in the Briones Montoto (formerly Romeo y Julieta) Factory in Havana.

=== Don Alfredo ===
Don Alfredo cigars were created in the 1960s for Dunhill and were named after Alfred Dunhill. They were produced at the José Marti (formerly H. Upmann) Factory.

=== La Flor del Punto ===
La Flor del Punto cigars are believed to have been introduced in the 1970s and produced in the Partagás factory. The name may be a reference to the white spot of inset ivory on the shank of Dunhill smoking pipes, as one of the meanings of the Spanish word punto is "dot" or "point".

=== Dunhill brand ===
Beginning in 1977, Dunhill and Cubatabaco began discussing the possibility of producing a cigar brand called Dunhill. An agreement was reached in 1982 and Dunhill cigars began appearing in stores in 1984, starting in ten countries and eventually expanding to thirty.

When the contract expired in 1991, Dunhill chose not to renew, having already begun evaluating possible new locations in the Canary Islands, Dominican Republic and Honduras for cigar production. Eventually, Dunhill would stop making cigars and sold the rights to put its name on tobacco products to British American Tobacco.

== Gallery ==
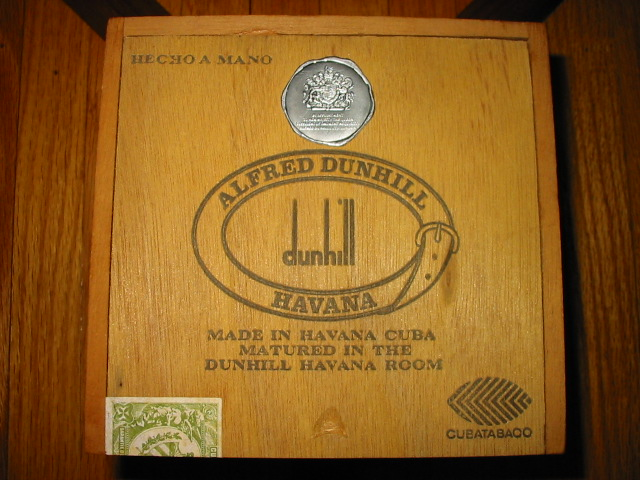
A box of Dunhill cabinet selection cigars

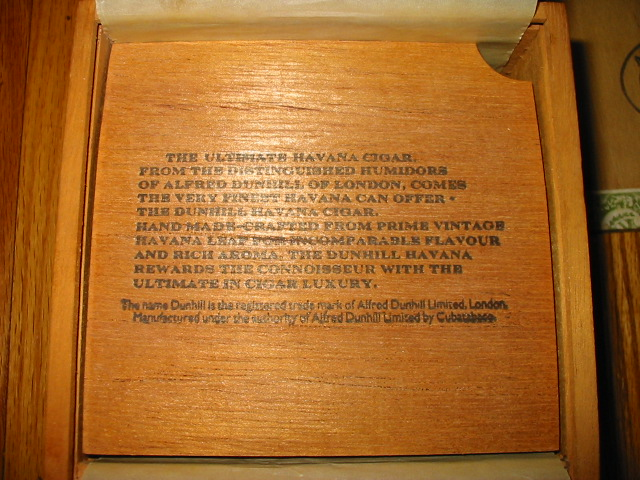
The cedar divider inside a Dunhill cabinet

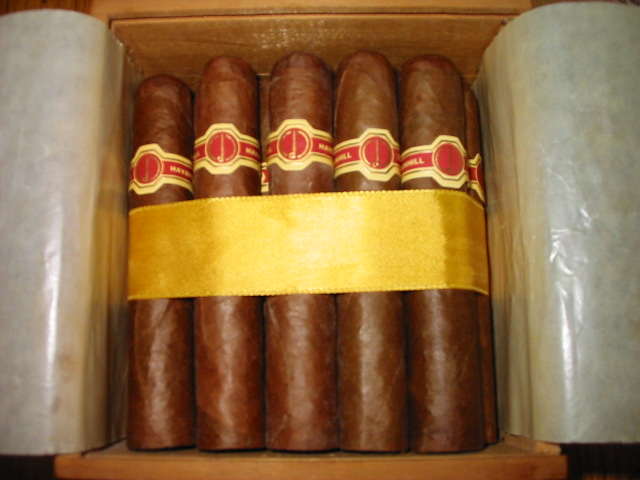
A box of cabinet selection Dunhill Cabinettas

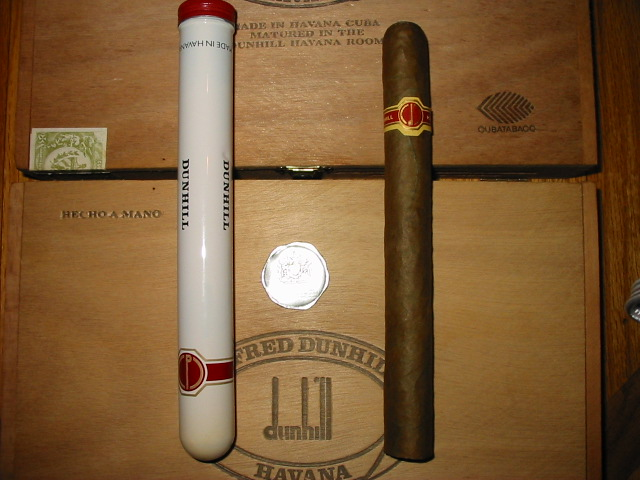
Dunhill Estupendos

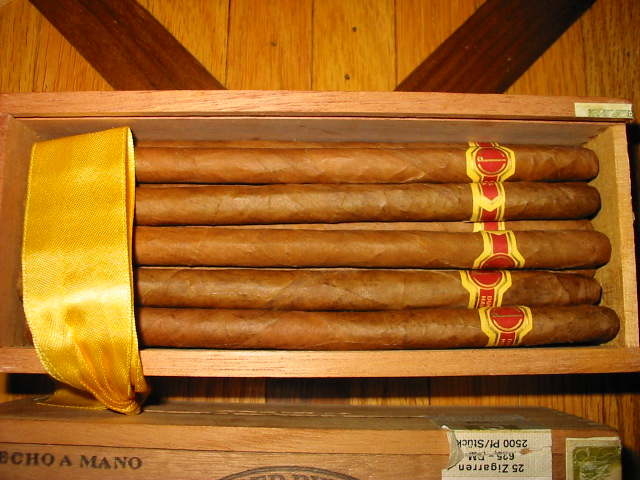
A box of cabinet selection Dunhill Atados

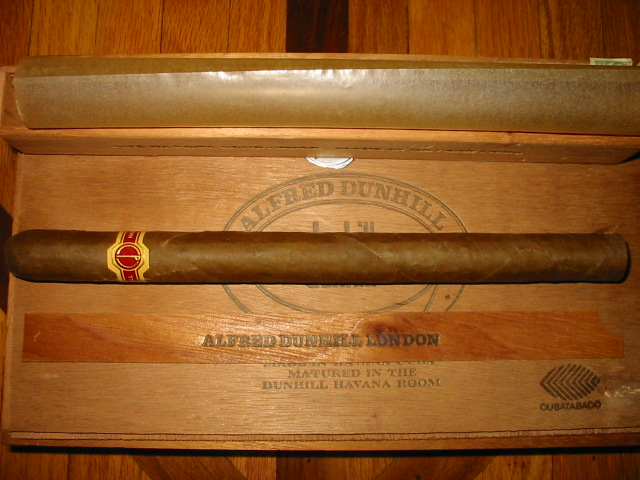
Dunhill Havana Club

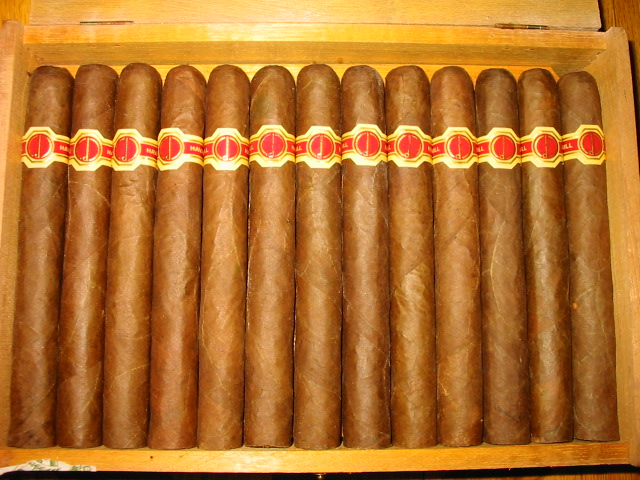
A box of box-pressed Dunhill Mojitos

== See also ==
- List of cigar brands
