= Diplomáticos (brand) =

Cuban cigar brand

Diplomáticos is a cigar brand, produced on the island of Cuba for Habanos SA, the Cuban state-owned tobacco company, at the José Martí factory in Havana.

The Diplomáticos logo

== History ==
Diplomáticos was the first new brand of Cuban cigars after the Cuban Revolution produced commercially for public sale (the Cohiba was the very first brand created post-Revolution, but was only used for President Fidel Castro's private consumption and diplomatic gifts, and was not sold on the commercial market until 1982).

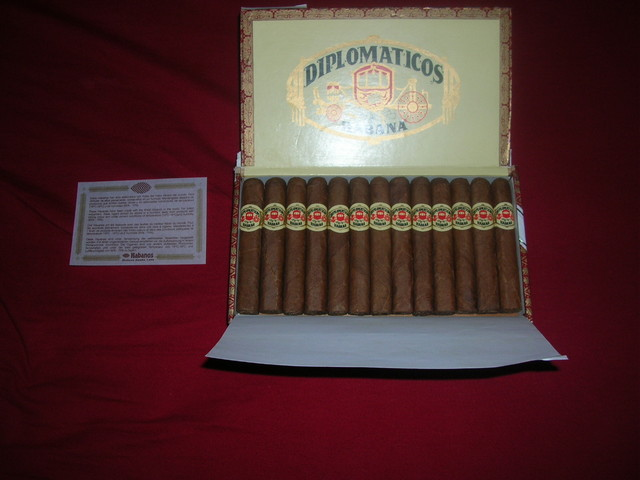
A box of Diplomáticos cigars

Diplomáticos was created in 1966 from the Montecristo, and featured a slightly milder blend and lighter shade wrapper intended to appeal to the French consumer. The Diplomáticos line mimics the original Montecristo line in having five numbered sizes, all handmade, but priced slightly less than the equivalent-size Montecristo cigar. Today, both Diplomáticos and Montecristo are produced at the José Martí Factory. Diplomaticos continue to utilize a medium-strong long-filler blend from the Vuelta Abajo region slightly milder than that of the cigars from the Montecristo line, but otherwise equal in terms of quality.

The original line consisted of five numbered sizes, corresponding to Montecristo. In 1976, the No. 6 and No. 7 were introduced to the line and were the same size as the Montecristo Especial No. 1 and Especial No. 2, but were discontinued a few years later in the mid-1980s.

=== Vitolas in the Diplomáticos Line ===
The following list of vitolas de salida (commercial vitolas) within the Diplomáticos marque lists their size and ring gauge in Imperial (and Metric), their vitolas de galera (factory vitolas), and their common name in American cigar slang.

Hand-Made Vitolas

- No. 2 - 6 1/8" x 52 (156 x 20.64 mm), Pirámide, a pyramid
- No. 4 - 5 1/8" x 42 (130 x 16.67 mm), Mareva, a petit corona
- No. 5 - 4" x 40 (102 x 15.88 mm), Perla, a petit corona

== See also ==
- Cigar brands
