= Saint Luis Rey (cigar) =

Cuban cigar brand

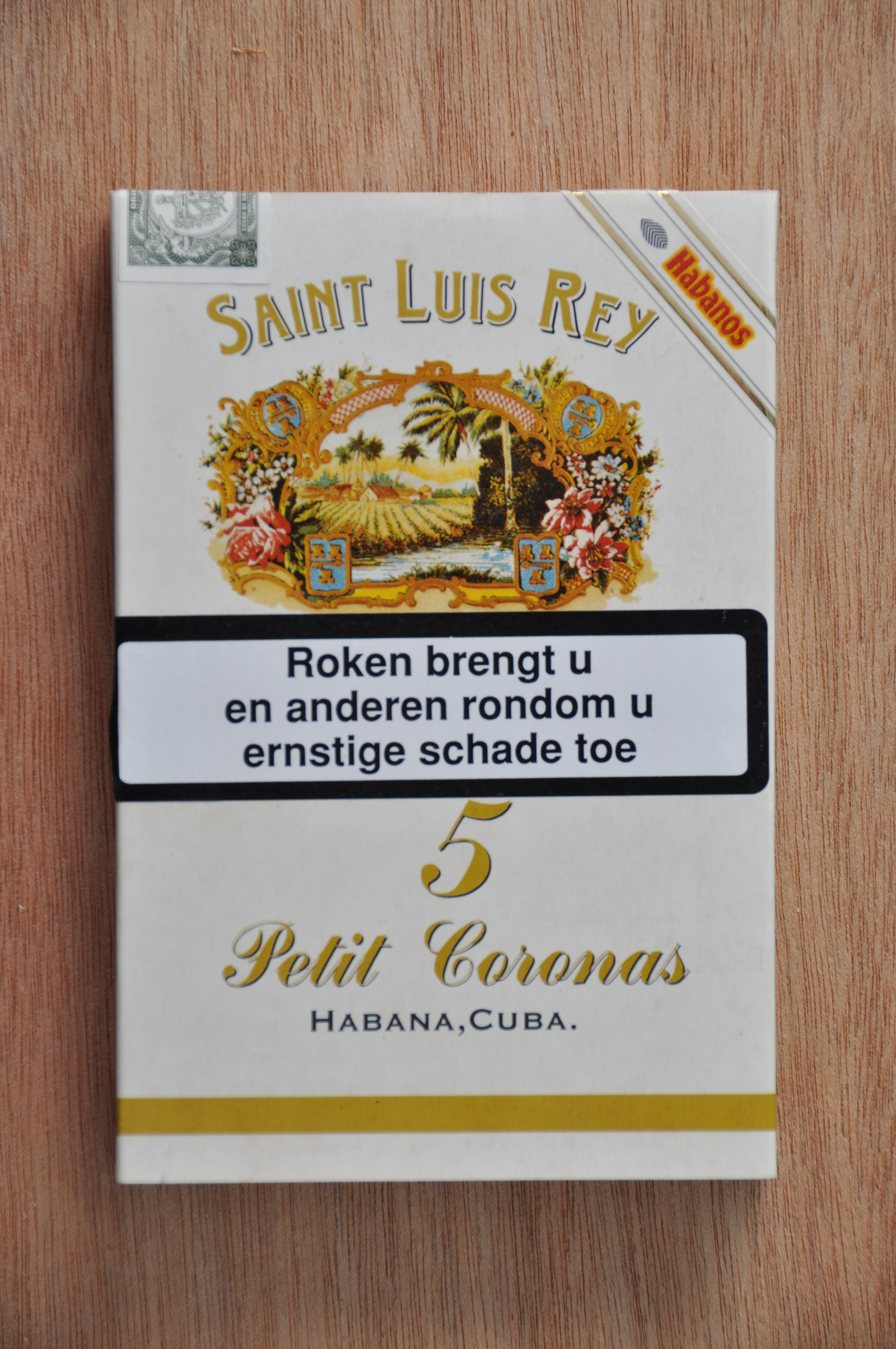
A pack of Saint Luis Rey with a Dutch warning label

Saint Luis Rey is a Cuban cigar brand produced by Habanos S.A., the state-owned tobacco company.

== History ==
The brand's name is believed to be a reference to either the town of San Luis, Pinar del Río or the popular 1927 novel The Bridge of San Luis Rey by American author Thornton Wilder. The brand was first registered by Zamora y Guerra Co., who were based in Havana. In 1940, the name Saint Luis Rey was registered by two English tobacco importers, Nathan Silverstone and Michael De Keyser.

The Saint Luis Rey factory and its assets were nationalized by the Cuban government on September 15, 1960. From 1960 until 1992, the brand was marketed exclusively in the UK market by NR Silverstone Cigar Ltd. In 1993, Habanos S.A. began exporting the brand worldwide.

In the US, the Saint Luis Rey trademark was registered by Altadis. In 2008, Altadis was acquired by Imperial Tobacco.

== Production ==
Saint Luis Rey cigars are produced at the Briones Montoto factory in Havana, where Romeo y Julieta cigars are also produced. All Cuban-production Saint Luis Rey cigars are made with leaves sourced from the Vuelta Abajo region.

The brand is known for the Lonsdale size, which was a favorite of Frank Sinatra.
