= Cuaba =

Cuban cigar brand

Cuaba is the name of a Cuban cigar brand produced in Cuba for Habanos SA, the Cuban state-owned tobacco company.

The Cuaba logo

== History ==
Cuaba was officially launched by Habanos president Francisco Linares on November 19, 1996, at Claridge's Hotel in London, Great Britain, as an all-perfecto line of cigars. Perfectos are cigars that are closed at both ends, with a rounded head. The brand was launched in an attempt to revive figurados, which had initially been very popular in the early 20th century but had declined since about the 1950s. For the release party, the creator of the line, Carlos Izquierdo González, and fourteen other highly skilled torcedores (cigar rollers) demonstrated making figurado cigars. The original Cuabas were of slightly differing sizes within the same box, due to a cigar mold not being used to press them into shape. When molds were finally made for Cuaba around a year later, these original non-molded cigars became great collector's items.

González claims he styled the Cuaba blend after Montecristo, but most cigar connoisseurs believe the blend used is more similar in taste to Romeo y Julieta. Unsurprisingly, most Cuaba cigars are manufactured in the Briones Montoto (Romeo y Julieta) factory.

In 1998, Cuaba had the distinction of being one of the cigar brands chosen to be released with a special vitola (the Distinguidos) in a Millennium Reserve ceramic jar humidor and is often a brand chosen for special releases and humidors.

== Construction ==
All Cuaba cigars are made at the Briones Montoto (Romeo y Julieta) factory in Havana Cuba using tobacco sourced from the Vuelta Abajo (Pinar del Rio). Each Cuaba cigar is hand-made, using only Grade 7 rollers (the highest certification).

== Vitolas in the Cuaba Line ==
The following list of vitolas de salida (commercial vitolas) within the Cuaba marque lists their size and ring gauge in Imperial (and Metric), their vitolas de galera (factory vitolas), and their common name in American cigar slang.

Hand-Made Vitolas

- Diademas - 9 1/8" × 55 (232 × 21.83 mm), Diademas, a giant perfecto
- Distinguidos - 6 3/8" × 52 (162 × 20.64 mm), Romeos, a perfecto
- Divinos - 4" × 43 (102 × 17.07 mm), Petit Bouquet, a petit perfecto
- Exclusivos - 5 3/4" × 46 (146 × 18.26 mm), Exquisitos, a perfecto
- Generosos - 5 1/4" × 42 (133 × 16.67 mm), Generosos, a perfecto
- Salomónes I - 7 1/4" × 57 (184 × 22.62 mm), Salomónes, a double perfecto
- Tradicionales - 4 3/4" × 42 (121 × 16.67 mm), Favoritos, a petit perfecto

== See also ==
- Cigar brands
