= Quai d'Orsay (cigar) =

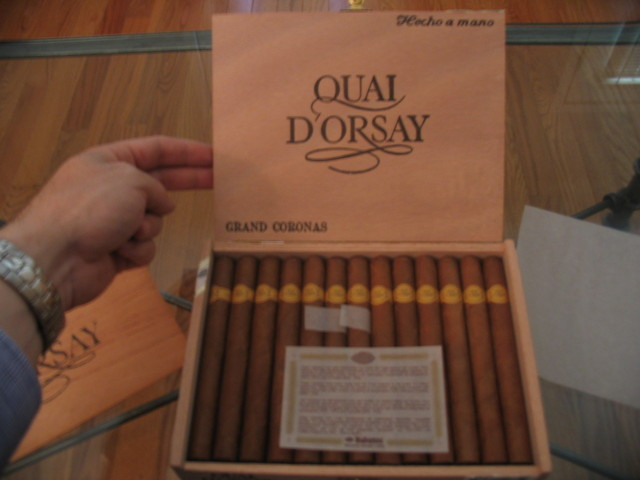
A box of Quai d'Orsay Gran Coronas

Quai d'Orsay is a cigar brand, made in Cuba under contract with Habanos SA.

== History ==
The Quai d'Orsay brand was created by Cubatabaco in 1973 for the French state tobacco monopoly, SEITA. There are multiple arguments about what the marque's name refers to: one is that it is referring simply to the famous Paris avenue; another is that it refers to the French Foreign Ministry that is located on it; and another is that it is referring to the headquarters of SEITA which is also on the same avenue.

Quai d'Orsay was apparently outside the umbrella of Habanos SA for a number of years and was managed directly by Cubatabaco and SEITA. Up until the late 1980s, Quai d'Orsay still manufactured its Coronas in two different wrapper shades: Claro and Claro Claro. As the fashion for lighter wrappers diminished, production eventually ceased the Coronas Claro Claro. Though the box is still written with Coronas on it, the official production name is still Coronas Claro.

Quai d'Orsay logo

=== Vitolas in the Quai d'Orsay Line ===
The following list of vitolas de salida (commercial vitolas) within the Quai d'Orsay marque lists their size and ring gauge in both imperial and metric, their vitolas de galera (factory vitolas), and their common name in American cigar slang.

- Corona Claro – 5 5/8" × 42 (143 × 16.67 mm), Corona, a corona
- Imperial – 7" × 47 (178 × 18.65 mm), Julieta No. 2, a churchill
- Panetela – 7" × 33 (178 × 13.10 mm), Ninfa, a slim panetela
- Hermosos No. 2 – 6 1/8" × 48 (157 × 19.05 mm) Senadores (2019 Limited Edition)

== See also ==
- Cigar brands
