= Sancho Panza (brand) =

Cuban cigars

- Product type: Cuban cigar
- Produced by: Habanos S.A.
- Introduced: 1848
- Previous owners: Ramón Allones; Rey Del Mundo Cigar Co.

Sancho Panza is a cigar brand in Cuba dating from 1848, and still produced there by Habanos S.A., the Cuban state-owned tobacco company.

== History ==
Named for the squire to Don Quixote in Miguel de Cervantes' 1605 novel of the same name, the name "Sancho Panza" was first used for a Havana cigar in 1848, when the marca of "Sancho Panza" was registered by Don Emilio Ohmsted. The original factory was located at 48 Angeles St. in Havana. Sometime during the 1880s, the brand was acquired by Ramon Allones and in 1940 was purchased by the Rey Del Mundo Cigar Co. The Sancho Panza factory and its assets were nationalized by the Cuban government on September 15, 1960.

== Products ==
In Cuba, Sancho Panza cigars are produced by hand using long-filler tobacco sourced from the Vuelta Abajo region. The brand is noted for offering several larger cigar sizes, such as the Sanchos and the Belicosos. Most vitolas in the line are generally regarded as medium-bodied for Cuban cigars, and are often described as having a characteristic, slightly saline flavour profile.

== Non-Cuban production ==
In the United States, the Sancho Panza trademark was registered in 1981 by Villazon & Company, and the trademark was later acquired by the General Cigar Company. General Cigar markets a line of Honduran cigars with the Sancho Panza brand name incorporating a Honduran or Connecticut Broadleaf wrapper and binder.
