= Ramón Allones =

Cuban and Honduran cigar brands

Ramón Allones is the name of two premium cigar brands. The first one is produced on Cuba for Habanos SA, the Cuban state-owned tobacco company. The other is produced in Honduras for General Cigar Company, now a subsidiary of Swedish Match.

The Ramón Allones logo

== History ==
The brand was created in Cuba by brothers Ramón and Antonio Allones (no relation to the Antonio Allones of El Rey del Mundo fame) in 1845, and is supposedly the first cigar brand to have utilized colored lithographs for box art, the first brand to utilise bands on cigars, and the first to package cigars in the "8-9-8" style (though there are several rival claimants as to who first made box art and bands).

The brand went through numerous ownership changes before it was finally bought by the Cifuentes family and production was moved to the famous Partagás Factory, where Ramón Allones cigars are still made to this day.

On September 15, 1960, the revolutionary Cuban government nationalised all Cuban cigar manufacturing and production, including seizure of the Partagás factory where Ramón Allones cigars were manufactured. The brand was selected for continued production and continues to be manufactured in Havana. Cuban-made Ramón Allones cigars are medium-full to full strength in body, and the blend shares some of the characteristics of Partagás in terms of overall body, vitolas, and packaging.

Since 2001, when Altadis bought a controlling share of Habanos SA, the Ramón Allones marque has seen the majority of its manufactured sizes discontinued, including the Coronas and even the 8-9-8 size it helped pioneer. Of the sizes available now, the Specially Selected, Gigantes, and Small Club Coronas are popular among aficionados.

The Belicoso vitola released for the UK market may have been a prototype for the regional edition program, as it appeared first, being imported only to the UK, and without any additional bands or special packaging.

=== Vitolas in the Ramón Allones Line ===
The following are the vitolas de salida (commercial vitolas) within the Ramón Allones marque lists their size and ring gauge in Imperial and Metric, their vitolas de galera (factory vitolas), and their common name in American cigar slang.

Hand-Made Vitolas

- Gigante - 7 5/8" × 49 (194 × 19.45 mm), Prominente, a double corona
- Small Club Corona - 4 3/8" × 42 (111 × 16.67 mm), Minuto, a petit corona
- Specially Selected - 4 7/8" × 50 (124 × 19.84 mm), Robusto, a robusto

Edición Regional Releases

- Selección Suprema (Italy 2005) - 5 5/8" × 46 (143 × 18.26 mm) Corona Gorda, a toro
- Eminencia (Switzerland 2005, 2007) - 5 5/8" × 44 (143 × 17.46 mm), Francisco, a corona
- Belicoso (UK 2005) - 5 1/2" × 52 (140 × 20.64 mm) Campana, a belicoso
- Estupendo (Asia Pacific 2006, 2007) - 7" × 47 (178 × 18.65 mm), Julieta No. 2, a churchill
- Gran Robusto (Benelux 2007, 2008) - 6 1/8" × 50 (155 × 19.84 mm) Doble, a double robusto
- Especial de Allones (France 2008) - 5 1/2" × 52 (140 × 20.64 mm) Campana, a belicoso
- Phoenicios (Lebanon 2008, 2009) - 6 1/2" × 54 (164 × 21.43 mm) Sublime, a double robusto
- Grande (Spain 2008) - 7 1/4" × 49 (184 × 19.45 mm) Paco, a churchill
- Celestial Fino (Asia Pacific 2009) - 5 3/8" × 46 (137 × 18.26 mm) Británica, a perfecto
- Petit Únicos (Canada 2009) - 5" × 50 (127 × 19.84 mm) Petit Pirámide, a petit pyramid
- Beritus (Lebanon 2009) - 5 3/8" × 52 (135 × 20.64 mm) Edmundo, a robusto extra
- Patagón (Chile, Argentina and Uruguay 2016) - (110mm x 52) Petit Edmundo (Source: Cigar Chile Ltd. Habanos Subdistributor for Chile)

Edición Limitada Releases

- Allones Extra (Edición Limitada 2011) - 5 5/8" × 44 (143 × 17.46 mm), Francisco, a corona

== See also ==
- Cigar brands
