= San Cristobal de la Habana =

San Cristobal de la Habana may refer to:

- The historic name of Havana
- San Cristobal de la Habana (cigar)
