= Quintero (cigar) =

Brand of premium cigars produced in Cuba

- Product type: Cigar
- Current owner: Imperial Brands
- Produced by: Habanos S.A.
- Country: Cuba
- Introduced: 1924; 102 years ago
- Related brands: Cohiba; Montecristo; Romeo y Julieta
- Website: habanos.com/quintero

Quintero is a cigar brand owned by British conglomerate Imperial Brands. The cigars are produced in Cuba by Habanos S.A., a state-owned tobacco company.

== History ==
The Quintero cigar brand was created as Quintero y Hermanos or Quintero and Brothers, when Agustín Quintero and his four brothers opened a small cigar factory in the town of Cienfuegos, Cuba in 1924 and began producing a handmade cigar.

Quintero is popular in Cuba and in Spain. By the 1940s, Quintero y Hermanos had opened a larger rolling factory in Havana, and had begun using prime tobaccos from the Vuelta Abajo region.

It the early 1960s, after Fidel Castro nationalized the Cuban cigar industry, Quintero became a primarily machine-made cigar, and most of the handmade sizes were dropped in favor of machine-made or hand-finished cigars using short filler tobaccos. For many years, Quintero was the only Cuban machine-made brand to be globally marketed by Habanos SA.

In 2002, as part of a marketing strategy to promote Cuban cigars, the Cuban government marketing organization, Habanos S.A. chose to discontinue machine-made cigars in favor of handmade versions.
