= Cigar box =

Box containing cigars

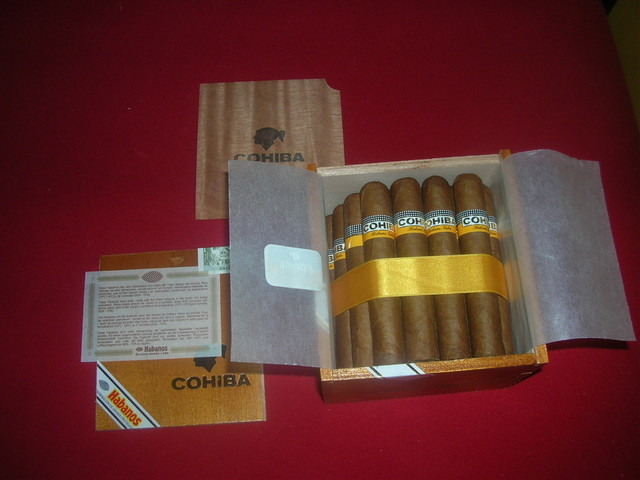
Cohiba Robustos slide-lid cabinet box

A cigar box is a box container for cigar packaging. Traditionally, cigar boxes have been made of wood, cardboard or paper. Spanish cedar has been described as the "best" kind of wood for cigar boxes because of its beautiful grain, fine texture, pleasant odor and ability to keep out insects. Eucalyptus and yellow poplar have been popular substitutes that were sometimes stained and scented to resemble it. Other typical woods for cigar boxes include mahogany, elm, and white oak; less popular are basswood, Circassian walnut, and rosewood.

There are several types of cigar boxes, differing both in construction and purpose. The following are common boxes:

- Cabinet selection, slid-lid or hinged lid, typically storing 25 or 50 cigars;
- 8-9-8, round-sided box with three layers, counting 8, 9 and 8 cigars respectively;
- flat top or 13-topper, two layers with 12 on bottom and 13 on top;
- boxes of box-pressed cigars, stored two layers with same number of cigars.

Cigar boxes, labels, and bands are considered a subject of art, with businesses specializing in them and books printed on their design, meaning, and significance. As a result, cigar boxes and their corresponding labels can be considered collectible items.

Empty cigar boxes have been used as a source of wood for hobbies and folk art, such as tramp art and cigar box guitars, especially during the Great Depression. There is a modern revival of guitars being made from cigar boxes and other materials not usually used for musical instruments.

== Media ==
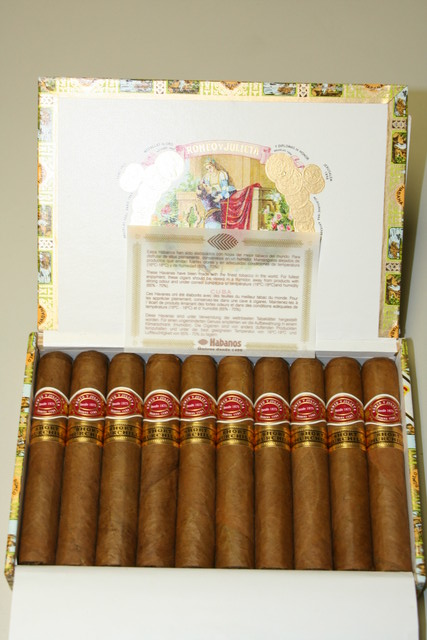
A hinged-lid flat top box of box-pressed cigars

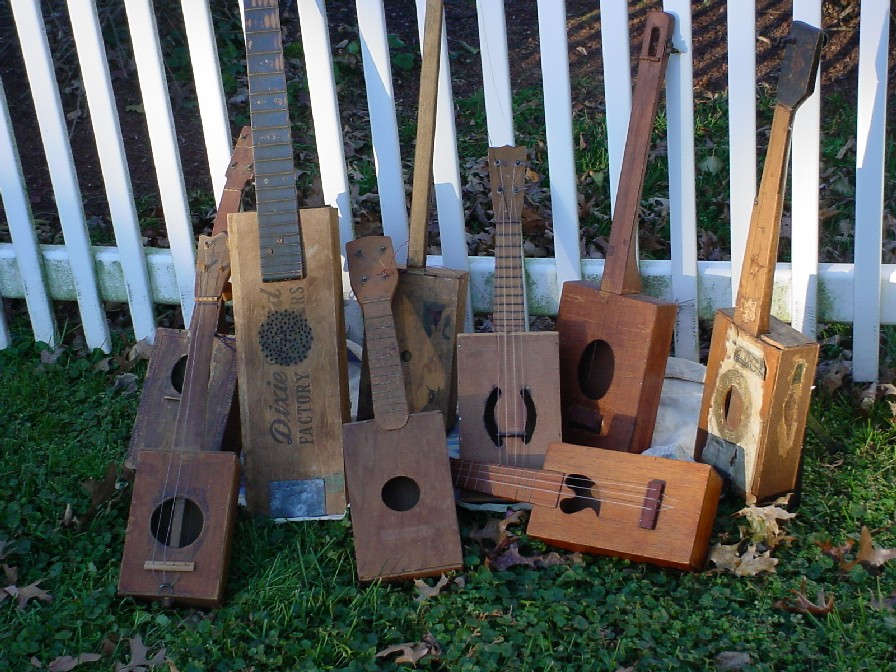
Cigar box guitar collection

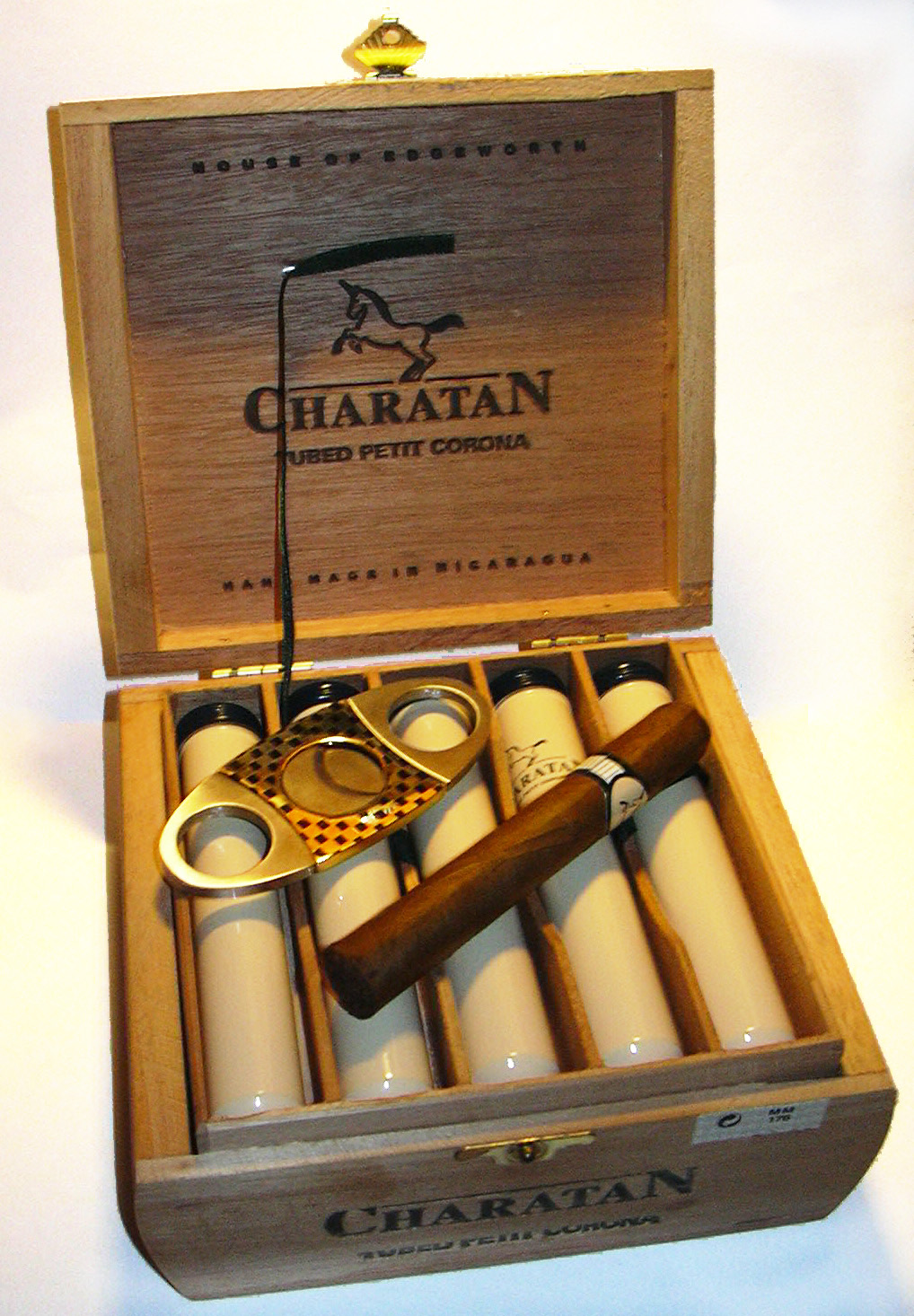
Cigar box with cigar cases

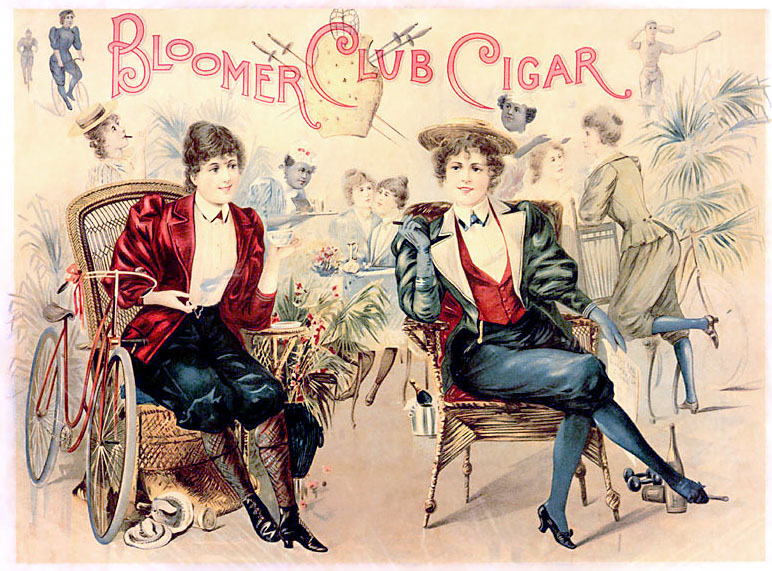
An example of cigar label art
