= El Rey del Mundo (cigar) =

- Industry: Tobacco
- Founded: 1848; 178 years ago
- Headquarters: Cuba
- Area served: Worldwide
- Products: Premium Cigar
- Parent: Habanos S.A.

El Rey del Mundo is the name of two cigar brands, one produced in Cuba for Habanos SA, the Cuban state-owned tobacco company, and other produced in Honduras by the Villazon family.

The El Rey del Mundo logo

== History ==
El Rey del Mundo (King of the World in Spanish) is believed to have been created, along with Sancho Panza, by German businessman Emilio Ohmstedt in 1848

Spanish businessman Antonio Allones took over the brand sometime around 1882. In 1905, Allones' company was purchased by Díaz Hermanos y Cía, owned by Cándido Vega Díaz. Production moved to a factory at 852 Calle Belascoain in Havana.

The brand remained popular throughout the 1960s and 1970s.

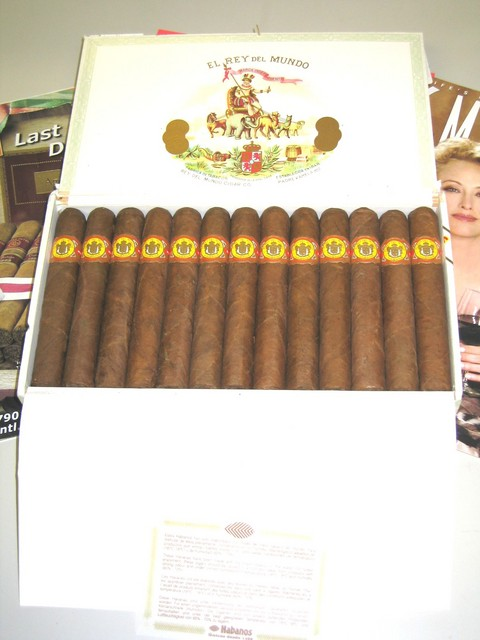
A box of El Rey del Mundo Choix Suprem

== See also ==
- List of cigar brands
