= Vegueros =

Vegueros is a brand of premium cigars produced on the island of Cuba for Habanos SA.

The Vegueros logo

== History ==
In 1961, the Francisco Donatién Factory, in the Pinar del Río Province of Cuba began producing cigars for domestic consumption, in addition to the cigarettes it had been producing for years. These cigars were commonly rolled for national banquets and other public affairs and became colloquially known as Vegueros, after the farmers and field hands that work on Cuba's tobacco and sugar cane plantations. The first people outside of Cuba to become acquainted with these cigars were sight-seeing tourists on trips through Cuba's cigar tobacco-growing regions. In 1997, Habanos SA launched the cigars for export.

=== Vitolas in the Vegueros line ===
The following list of vitolas de salida (commercial vitolas) within the Vegueros marque lists their size and ring gauge in Imperial (and Metric), their vitolas de galera (factory vitolas), and their common name in American cigar slang.

Hand-made Vitolas

- Especial No. 1 - 7 1/2 × 38 in (191 × 15.08 mm), Laguito No. 1, a long panetela
- Especial No. 2 - 6 × 38 in (152 × 15.08 mm), Laguito No. 2, a panetela
- Mareva - 5 1/8 × 42 in (130 × 16.67 mm), Mareva, a petit corona
- Seoane - 4 7/8" × 33 in (124 × 13.10 mm), Seoane, a small panetela

== See also ==
- Cigar brands
