= Por Larrañaga =

Cigar brand

- Product type: Cigar
- Current owner: Imperial Brands
- Produced by: Habanos S.A. Altadis
- Country: Cuba
- Introduced: 1834; 192 years ago

Por Larrañaga (meaning by Larrañaga) is the name of a cigar brand produced in Cuba for Habanos S.A., the Cuban state-owned tobacco company, as well as a non-Cuban line of cigars produced in the Dominican Republic and Honduras for Altadis, a subsidiary of Imperial Brands. Por Larrañaga cigars have been in continuous production in Cuba since 1834.

== History ==
=== Cuba Production ===
Por Larrañaga was registered in 1834 by Ignacio Larrañaga, a Spanish immigrant who came to Havana in 1825. Larrañaga established his first factory at 58 San Miguel Street in the city. By the end of the 19th century, In 1920, the company acquired an expanded factory facility on Carlos Tercero (Carlos III) Street in Havana.

In 1925, Por Larrañaga overcame labor interruptions and shortages to become the first factory to produce machine-made cigars. This accomplishment was facilitated by the acquisition of rolling and wrapping machinery from the United States

The innovative technology allowed for the utilization of high-quality Cuban leaf to create a cigar with an adequate draw, at approximately 25% of the cost of hand-rolled cigars. Training a machine operator could be accomplished within two weeks, a significant departure from the years of training required for the skill-intensive process of manual cigar rolling. Por Larrañaga's initiative to implement automated cigar manufacturing in the region triggered strikes and a boycott among factory cigar-rollers. Consequently, the company was compelled to return the machines to the original seller.

In 1960, the Cuban revolutionary government nationalized all cigar companies including Por Larrañaga. During the revolution, Por Larrañaga held the position of the sixth-largest Cuban brand in terms of production. Production operations transitioned from the Carlos III Street facility in Havana to the La Corona factory situated at Avenida 20 de Mayo.

Until the 1970s, Por Larrañaga retained its status as a respected and favored premium cigar brand. However, during the 1980s, production witnessed a sharp decline. Subsequent trademark disputes in the 1990s led to a substantial reduction in the brand's international export, restricted to a limited number of countries. For a period, the brand predominantly featured machine-made or hand-finished cigars, with sales primarily concentrated in Canada and the Middle East.

From 2002 onwards, all vitolas (cigar sizes) were exclusively crafted by hand, employing long-filler or short-filler leaf sourced from the Vuelta Abajo region.

In 2006, Habanos manufactured a limited quantity of Por Larrañaga Lonsdales, a vitola that had been discontinued and was deeply missed by brand enthusiasts. This production was specifically intended for distribution in Germany, with the cigars packaged in 25-count dress boxes. A distinctive second band was affixed to the cigars, bearing the inscription "Exclusivo Alemania" (Germany Exclusive).

Cigar Aficionado's December 2006 edition featured its inaugural review of a Por Larrañaga cigar beyond its "Connoisseur's Corner." The chosen petit corona garnered a score of 91 out of 100 on the magazine's rating scale.

=== Non-Cuban Production ===
Altadis U.S.A. obtained the rights to the Por Larrañaga brand in the United States. In 2016, the company revealed plans to produce a fresh collection of non-Cuban cigars using the Por Larrañaga label.

== Vitolas in the Por Larrañaga Line ==
The following compilation outlines the commercial vitolas of the Por Larrañaga brand, detailing their size and ring gauge in both Imperial and Metric measurements, along with their corresponding factory vitolas and colloquial names in American cigar terminology..

Hand-Made Vitolas

- Montecarlo - 6 1/4" × 33 (159 × 13.10 mm), Delicioso, a slim panetela
- Panetela - 5" × 36 (127 × 14.29 mm), Veguerito, a short panetela using short-filler leaf
- Petit Corona - 5 1/8" × 42 (130 × 16.67 mm), Mareva, a petit corona
- Edición Regional Releases
- Lonsdale (Germany 2006) - 6 1/2" × 42 (165 × 16.67 mm), Cervantes, a lonsdale
- Robusto de Larrañaga (Asia Pacific 2007) - 4 7/8" × 50 (124 × 19.84 mm), Robusto, a robusto or rothschild
- Magnifico (United Kingdom 2007, 2008) - 6 3/4" × 50 (171 × 19.84 mm), Partagás No. 16, a double robusto
- Belicoso Extra (Asia Pacific 2008) - 5 1/2" × 52 (140 × 20.64 mm), Campana, a belicoso
- Los Andes (Peru 2009) - 5" × 50 (127 × 19.84 mm) Petit Pirámide, a petit pyramid
- Valioso (Switzerland 2009) - 6 1/8" × 52 (156 × 20.64 mm) Pirámide, a pyramid or torpedo
- Robustos (Germany 2010) - 4 7/8" x 50 (124 x 19.84 mm) Robusto, a robusto or rothschild
- Encantos (Asia Pacific 2010) - 6 3/4" x 43 (170 x 17.07 mm) Dalias, a lonsdale
- Opera (France 2015) - 4 7/8" x 52 (115 x 20.64 mm) Petit Robusto*
- 5000 limited edition numbered boxes of ten

== UK Regional Specialities Release of Por Larranaga Magnificos ==
Introduced by Hunters & Frankau on November 1, the Por Larranaga Magnificos stands as an exclusive Habanos Regional Speciality designated solely for distribution in the UK (English Market Selection). Measuring 6 3/4 inches in length with a ring gauge of 50, this cigar was meticulously crafted to recreate the dimensions and taste profile of the 1970s Por Larranaga Magnum.

Only 1400 limited edition numbered boxes were produced, comprising 1000 tens and 400 boxes containing twenty-five cigars each.

== See also ==
- Cigar brands
- Cuban cigars
