= Habanos S.A. =

Cuban tobacco-manufacturing company

- Company type: S.A.
- Industry: Tobacco
- Founded: 1994; 32 years ago
- Headquarters: Havana, Cuba
- Products: Cigars, cigarettes
- Owner: Cubatabaco and Altadis
- Website: habanos.com
- Footnotes / references Carcinogenicity: IARC group 1

Habanos S.A. is a Cuban manufacturing company of tobacco that controls the promotion, distribution, and export of premium cigars and other tobacco products for Cuba worldwide. It was established in 1994.

Ownership of Habanos S.A. is split equally between state-owned Cubatabaco and privately held Spanish-based tobacco giant Altadis. The company commercialises the brands Cohiba, Montecristo, Bolívar, and Romeo y Julieta, amongst others.

== Overview ==
The word habanos (not normally capitalised) means literally (something) from Havana, and is the word used in the Spanish-speaking world for Havana cigars and, sometimes, cigars in general. Habanos S.A. owns the trademarks of every brand of Cuban-made cigars and cigarettes in the countries they are exported to and franchises the La Casa Del Habano chain of cigar stores. To control distribution and protect against counterfeiting, Habanos S.A. exports to only one company in each country (Hunters & Frankau for Great Britain and Gibraltar, 5th Avenue Cigars for Germany, Intertabak for Switzerland, Pacific Cigar Co. for most of the Pacific Rim, etc.). The only nation to which Habanos S.A. doesn't sell cigars is the United States, which has had a trade embargo against Cuba since 1962.

In 2000, the Franco-Spanish tobacco giant Altadis purchased 50% of Habanos S.A. There has been speculation that their influence has led to Habanos' drastic restructuring of their cigar lines and size offerings, the adoption of marketing practices and production methods more in-line with cigar companies that market in the US, and the increasing number of "special release" and "limited edition" lines of cigars. It has also been suggested that Altadis might be ramping Habanos up ready to trade with the US, anticipating the end of the embargo. On the other hand, some observers have noted a restoration of Cuban cigar quality, which had declined dramatically in the 1990s after the fall of the Soviet Union. Altadis was acquired by Imperial Tobacco in February 2008.

In May 2019, Imperial Tobacco announced their intention to sell their premium cigar division, including their share in Habanos S.A. One year later, Imperial Brands announced the sale of Habanos S.A. through two different transactions for a total of €1,225 million. Firstly the U.S.-based business, "Premium Cigar USA" will be sold to Gemstone Investment Holding Ltd., while second Allied Cigar Corp. will acquire Imperial Brands' cigar business in the rest of the world, "Premium Cigar RoW". The latter sale was later linked to the Cambodian Prince Group, which was indicated by the United States Department of Justice on wire fraud and money laundering charges in 2025.

Habanos S.A., holds a worldwide monopoly on selling Cuban cigars. In 2024, Habanos S.A. reported revenues of $827 million, reflecting a year-over-year increase of 16 percent. The company's primary export markets include Spain, Switzerland, the United Kingdom, and China.

== Habanos S.A. brands ==
Habanos currently has 27 brands of handmade cigars, all of them within the Habanos Protected Appellations of Origin:

Global brands:

- Cohiba
- Montecristo
- Romeo y Julieta
- Partagás
- Hoyo de Monterrey
- H. Upmann

High value portfolio brands:

- Trinidad
- Bolívar
- Punch
- Quai d'Orsay
- Ramón Allones

Volume portfolio brands:

- José L. Piedra
- Quintero
- Vegueros

Other brands:

- Cuaba
- San Cristóbal de La Habana
- Fonseca
- Vegas Robaina
- Diplomáticos
- El Rey del Mundo
- Juan López
- La Flor de Cano
- La Gloria Cubana
- Por Larrañaga
- Rafael González
- Saint Luis Rey
- Sancho Panza

== Distributors and countries of distribution ==
Distributor	Country of distribution
Barone Tobacco Trading Limited	Israel
The Cigar Company (SA) (PTY) LTD	South Africa
Phoenicia Trading T.A.A. (CYPRUS) LTD.	Lebanon, Syria, Republic of Ukraine, Qatar, Bahrain, United Arab Emirates, Saudi Arabia, Iran, Malta, Jordan, Oman, Cyprus, Iraq, Afghanistan, Africa (except Algeria, Morocco and South Africa), Greece, Pakistan, Kuwait, Yemen and Turkey.
Société Marocaine des Tabacs	Morocco
Caribbean Cigars Corporation N.V.	Panama, British Virgin Islands, St. Barthelemy, St. Kitts and Nevis, Suriname, Guadeloupe, St. Lucia, Trinidad and Tobago, Turks and Caicos Islands, Jamaica, St. Martin, St. Maarten, St. Vincent and the Grenadines, Bonaire, Haiti, St. Eustatius, Antigua and Barbuda, Dominica, Barbados, Curaçao, French Guiana, Anguilla, Montserrat, Martinique, Grenada, Aruba, Bahamas, Bermuda, Grand Cayman, El Salvador, Belize, Honduras and Guatemala.
Caribe Imports S.A.S.	Colombia
Cruz Canela & Trust G B Sociedad Anónima	Costa Rica and Nicaragua
Dalso S.R.L.	Dominican Republic
Emporium Cigars Importação e Comercialização de Tabaco Ltda.	Brazil
Havana House Cigars and Tobacco Merchants Ltd.	Canada
Puro Tabaco S.A.	Argentina, Chile and Uruguay
Vegas del Caribe S.A.C.	Peru, Ecuador and Bolivia
Importadora y Exportadora de Puros y Tabacos, S.A. DE C.V.(I.E.P.T.)	Mexico
Kukenan Tobacco Trading C.A.	Venezuela
Habanos, S.A.	Cuba
The Pacific Cigar Co. Ltd.	Hong Kong, Japan, Singapore, Philippines, Malaysia, Australia, New Zealand, Indonesia, Fiji Islands, Brunei, Papua New Guinea, Sri Lanka, Bangladesh, Thailand, Cambodia, South Korea, Taiwan, Vietnam, Laos, Myanmar, Mongolia, Macau, Maldives, New Caledonia, French Polynesia, Vanuatu, North Korea, Bhutan, Solomon Islands, Kiribati, Nauru, Samoa, East Timor, Tonga, Tuvalu and Marshall Islands and Palau.
RAAS Intratech PVT. Ltd.	India
Infifon Hong Kong Limited	China
Laguito 1492	Belgium, the Netherlands and Luxembourg
Fifth Avenue Products Trading, GMBH	Germany, Austria, and Poland
Habanos Nordic AB	Iceland, Finland, Denmark, Sweden, Norway, Estonia, Latvia, and Lithuania.
Empor Importacao & Exportacao, S.A.	Portugal
Diadema S.P.A.	Italy, Vatican and San Marino
Kaliman Caribe	Bulgaria, Albania, Armenia, North Macedonia, Serbia, Montenegro, Bosnia and Herzegovina, Croatia, Slovenia, Romania and Georgia.
Hunters & Frankau	United Kingdom, Channel Islands, Gibraltar and the Republic of Ireland
Maori Tabacs S.A.	Andorra
Tabacalera S.L.U.	Spain except for the Canary Islands
Tabak Invest A.S.	Czech Republic, Slovakia and Hungary
Castilia Trading & Investments Limited	Palestine
Intertabak, A.G.	Switzerland and Liechtenstein
Cuba Cigar, S.L.U.	Canary Islands
Coprova, S.A.S.	France, Algeria and Monaco

== See also ==
- Vuelta Abajo
- List of cigar brands
