= Alfred Dunhill =

English tobacconist, entrepreneur and fashion designer

Alfred Dunhill FRSA
- Dunhill in 1893
- Born: 30 September 1872; Hornsey, Middlesex, England
- Died: 2 January 1959 (aged 86); Worthing, Sussex, England
- Education: The Lower School of John Lyon
- Occupations: Tobacconist; entrepreneur; inventor
- Known for: Alfred Dunhill Limited

Alfred Dunhill (30 September 1872 – 2 January 1959) was an English tobacconist, entrepreneur and inventor. He is the progenitor of Alfred Dunhill Limited, a London-based luxury goods firm (owned by Swiss company Richemont), and the Dunhill tobacco products company owned by British American Tobacco (now two independently owned entities).

From 1893 Dunhill ran a company selling motoring accessories, and in 1902 opened a shop in Mayfair. He developed a pipe designed for motorists in 1904. He opened a tobacconist's shop in St James's in 1907, offering tailored tobacco blends. Shops were opened in New York and Paris during the 1920s. With his international ambitions, Dunhill helped to create the modern luxury goods market. He retired from business in 1929 and married his mistress in 1945, following the death of his wife.

== Early life ==
Alfred Dunhill was born on 30 September 1872 at 2 Church Path in Hornsey, Middlesex. He was the second son of five children of Henry Dunhill (1842–1901), a master blind-maker, and his wife and cousin, Jane, née Styles (1843–1922). His younger brother was the composer Thomas Dunhill. His father occupied premises on Euston Road, manufacturing harnesses for horses. Alfred Dunhill was educated at The Lower School of John Lyon in Harrow on the Hill and by tutors until he was 15, when he was apprenticed to his father's business.

== Early career ==
In 1893, Dunhill inherited his father's business and shortly afterwards began to supply accessories for motor cars under the name Dunhill's Motorities (a portmanteau of "motorist" and "priorities"). He married Alice Stapleton (1874–1945) on 15 June 1895. In 1890 he established the Discount Motor Car Company to sell his accessories through mail order. In 1902 he opened his first shop in Conduit Street, Mayfair, selling clothing and accessories to chauffeurs and their employers. He entered the pipemaking business in 1904 when he developed a "windshield pipe" to allow motorists to smoke while driving.

== Tobacco business ==
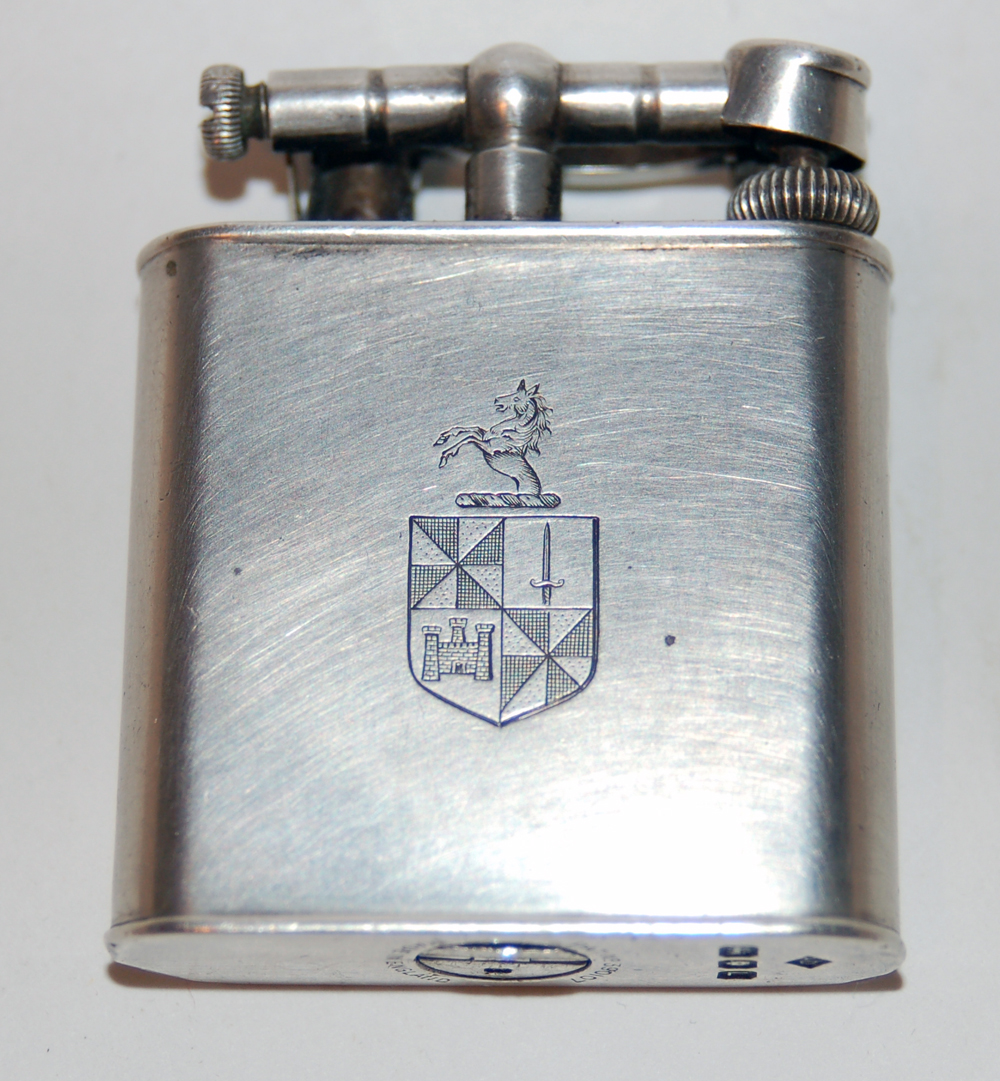
A Dunhill Unique lighter bearing a coat of arms

In 1907 he opened a small tobacconist's shop on Duke Street in the St James's area. He offered tobacco blends tailored for the individual customer. In 1908 he introduced the first Dunhill cigarette. The shop rapidly prospered. His granddaughter Mary later described his flair as a salesman and a shopkeeper.

The business expanded, and by 1910 Dunhill had taken additional premises in Duke Street. In 1912 he was joined in the business by his youngest brother, Herbert, and his eldest son, Alfred, followed by his second son, Vernon, in 1913. In 1912 Dunhill introduced the white spot trademark to its pipes. In 1934 he had the ship Lady Gay built as a personal motor cruiser; it later participated in the Dunkirk evacuation and was preserved until being destroyed by fire in 2021.

The post-war period witnessed both expansion and the commissioning of new products. The company always ensured its products were covered by patent and trade mark, a policy prosecuted with vigour from the outset. The early 1920s saw the wholesale and export side of the business move to Notting Hill Gate, close to the pipe and cigarette division located at Campden Hill Road.

== Royal warrant ==
In 1921 the firm received its first royal warrant, as tobacconist to Edward, Prince of Wales. Dunhill also supplied Winston Churchill and Siegfried Sassoon. The 1920s also saw the opening of shops in New York and Paris. Bloomberg Businessweek opined that Dunhill prefigured the modern luxury goods market with its international ambitions. In 1926 the company launched the Unique lighter, a product that Dunhill and his brother Herbert had much interest in developing, and was the world's first lighter that could be operated with just one hand.

== Publication ==
Also in 1924, Dunhill published The Pipe Book, a monograph which detailed the history of the smoking pipe. In The New York Times review of the book, the anonymous author credited Dunhill with making pipe smoking "a gentlemanly diversion". The book has rarely been out of print since its publication. Dunhill was elected as a fellow of the Royal Society of Arts in 1925.

== Retirement ==
Dunhill passed the chairmanship of his company to his son Alfred Henry Dunhill in 1928, taking retirement for health reasons. He left his wife and moved to Worthing to join his long-term mistress, Vera Mildred Wright (1902–1976), who changed her name to his by deed poll. Dunhill married Wright on 28 March 1945, shortly after the death of his first wife. He died in a nursing home in Worthing on 2 January 1959, and was cremated at Golders Green Crematorium. He left gross assets of £74,117 (equivalent to £1,499,347 in 2025). His second wife survived him.

== Works ==
- Dunhill, Alfred (1924). The Pipe Book. London: A. & C. Black. OCLC 909095159.
  - Reprinted: The Pipe Book. New York: Skyhorse Publishing Company. 2011. ISBN 9781616080495. OCLC 758870949.
- Dunhill, Alfred (1954). The Gentle Art of Smoking. New York: G. P. Putnam's Sons.; London: Max Reinhardt.
