= Montecristo (cigar) =

Brand of cigars and cigarettes

- Product type: Cigar, cigarette
- Current owner: Imperial Brands
- Produced by: Habanos S.A. Altadis
- Country: Cuba; Dominican Republic
- Introduced: 1935; 91 years ago
- Related brands: Cohiba; Romeo y Julieta
- Website: habanos.com/montecristo

Montecristo (Spanish pronunciation: [monteˈkɾisto]) is a brand of cigars and cigarettes produced separately and independently in Cuba by Habanos S.A., the national tobacco company, and in La Romana, Dominican Republic by Altadis, a subsidiary of British conglomerate Imperial Brands.

== History ==
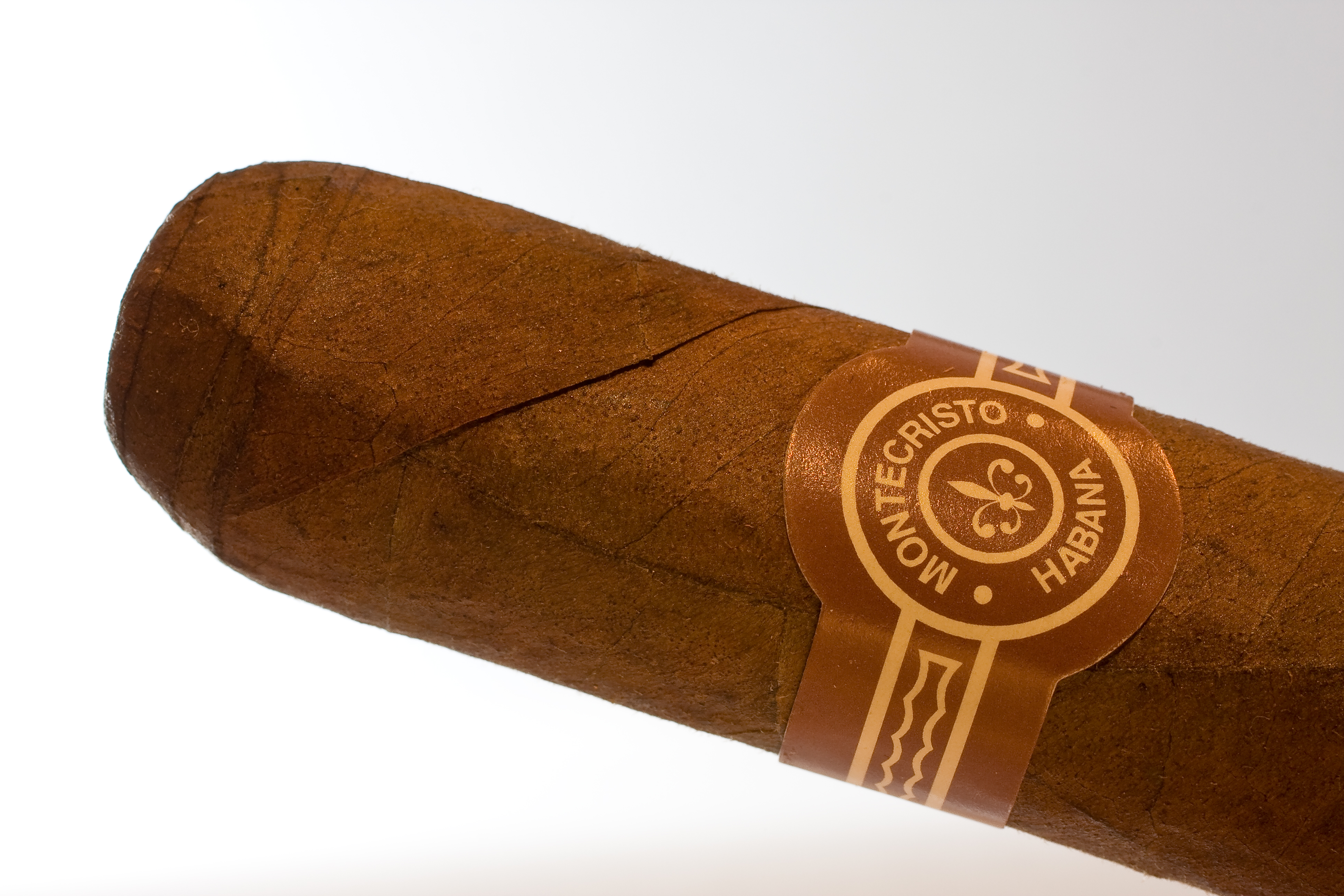
A Cuban Montecristo cigar

In July 1935, Alonso Menéndez purchased the Particulares Factory, makers of the Particulares brand and the lesser-known Byron. Immediately after its acquisition, he created a new brand named Montecristo.

The brand's name was inspired by The Count of Monte Cristo, a novel written by Alexandre Dumas père, which was allegedly a very popular novel among the torcedores (cigar rollers) in their factory to have read by the lector on the rolling floor. The Montecristo logo, consisting of a triangle of six swords surrounding a fleur-de-lis, was designed by John Hunter Morris and Elkan Co. Ltd., the brand's British distributor.

In July 1936, Menéndez founded a new firm with a partner, naming it Menéndez, García y Cía. With the growing success of the Montecristo brand, the firm purchased the faltering H. Upmann Factory (created by Hermann Dietrich Upmann in 1844) from J. Frankau SA in 1937 and transferred Montecristo production there. J. Frankau continued as sole distributor of the H. Upmann brand in the UK, while John Hunter Morris and Elkan Co. Ltd. was the sole distributor of Montecristo in Britain. In 1963, these firms merged to become "Hunters & Frankau", which today is the sole importer and distributor of all Cuban cigars in the UK.

Through the efforts of the Alfred Dunhill company, the Montecristo brand gained worldwide recognition and accounts for roughly one-quarter of Habanos SA's worldwide cigar sales, making it the most consumed Cuban cigar in the world.

Menéndez and García fled during the Cuban Revolution, and on September 15, 1960, after which the Montecristo brand, the factory, and all assets were nationalized by the government of Fidel Castro.

Menéndez and García re-established their brand in the Canary Islands, but were later forced to quit due to trademark disputes with Cubatabaco (later known as Habanos S.A.). In the mid-1970s, the operation was moved to La Romana and released for the US market, since Cuban government rights to the brand were not recognized under American law due to the 1960 nationalization and subsequent embargo. Menéndez, García, y Cía is now owned by Altadis S.A., which controls its distribution and marketing in the United States.

With Menendez and Garcia gone after 1959, one of the top grade torcedores, José Manuel González, was promoted to floor manager and proceeded to breathe new life into the brand. In the 1970s and 1980s, five new sizes were added: the A, the Especial No. 1 and 2, the Joyita, and the Petit Tubo. Three other sizes, the Montecristo No. 6, No. 7, and B, were released but subsequently discontinued, though the B can occasionally be found in very small releases each year in Cuba. Through the 1970s and 1980s, Cuban Montecristo continued to rise in popularity among cigar smokers, becoming one of that nations’s best-selling cigar brands.

== Today ==
=== Cuban Montecristo ===
The Montecristo No. 2 is the most popular cigar in the world market. In 2004 the Edmundo was added, a large robusto-sized cigar named for the hero of Dumas' The Count of Monte Cristo, Edmond Dantès.

The Montecristo No. 4 is the best selling Cuban cigar. It is a one-half to one hour's smoke, and is generally considered to be an excellent starting point for those new to Cuban cigars. The Montecristo No. 4 was the preferred cigar of Argentine revolutionary leader Ernesto "Che" Guevara.

Montecristo is regularly chosen to be featured in Habanos SA's annual Edición Limitada selection of cigars with a darker vintage wrapper, and issues numerous limited editions of cigars for special occasions, anniversaries, the annual Festival del Habano, charities, etc.

In 2007, a cigar called the Edmundo Dantes Conde 109 was released as a part of Habanos' regional edition series. All regional edition series boxes are numbered and the productions are limited. It uses a Montecristo blend and is believed to have a different name because of trademark right problems in Mexico. At the IX Festival de Habano, Habanos SA announced Montecristo No. 4 Reserva Cosecha 2002. This cigar is rolled in exactly the same vitola as the Montecristo No. 4, and features Vuelta Abajo tobacco from the 2002 crop aged a minimum of five years before being rolled into the cigar. Only 5,000 black lacquered cases are available and each case is numbered.

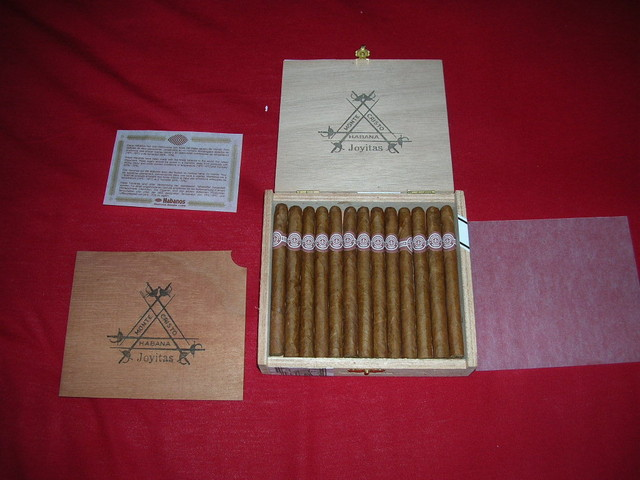
A box of Cuban Montecristo Joyitas

A new, lighter-bodied line was released at the XI Festival del Habano in February 2009. The planned name for the new line had been Sport, but because of EU regulations prohibiting marketing tobacco with sports imagery, the name was changed to Open with vitola names inspired by sports such as golf and yachting.

In 2011, Habanos SA announced at the XIII Festival del Habano the first ever Gran Reserva for Montecristo, Montecristo No. 2 Gran Reserva Cosecha 2006. This special cigar is rolled in exactly the same vitola as the legendary Montecristo No.2 Pirámides, and features Vuelta Abajo tobacco from the 2005 harvest aged at least five years before being rolled into the cigars. Only 5,000 densely lacquered boxes are available and each box is numbered.

The 80th anniversary of the Montecristo brand was celebrated in March 2015 at the VII Festival del Habano. Habanos SA revealed the Montecristo 80 Aniversario at the festival. This exclusive cigar comes in a simple, polished, dark-brown box that contains 20 cigars. Only 30,000 boxes are being produced. It was released in August 2016.

Montecristo also produces three machine-made cigarillos: the Mini, the Club, and the Purito.

== See also ==
- Cigar brands
