= San Cristobal de la Habana (cigar) =

Cuban cigar brand

San Cristobal de la Habana is the name of a Cuban cigar brand produced in Cuba for Habanos SA, the Cuban state-owned tobacco company.

The San Cristobal de la Habana logo

== History ==
San Cristobal de la Habana was officially launched in Havana on November 20, 1999. It was named after the original name of Havana which dates back to the 16th century.

Before the Revolution, a brand by the name of San Cristobal de la Habana existed, and it was produced until the Revolution. However, this new brand is completely unrelated and not a resurrection of the old brand.

The brand initially launched with 4 cigars (El Morro, El Principe, La Fuerza, and La Punta). In 2004, to celebrate the brand's fifth anniversary, 3 additional cigars were produced for the V Anniversary Humidor and eventually released for public sale. These new cigars, the Officios, Mercaderes and Muralla, also feature an additional "La Casa del Habano" band as these cigars were only available at La Casa del Habano retailers.

== Vitolas in the San Cristobal de la Habana Line ==
The following list of vitolas de salida (commercial vitolas) within the San Cristobal de la Habana marque lists their size and ring gauge in Imperial (and Metric), their vitolas de galera (factory vitolas), and their common name in American cigar slang.

Hand-Made Vitolas

- El Morro - 7 1/4" × 49 (184 × 19.45 mm), Paco, a double corona
- El Principe - 4 3/8" × 42 (111 × 16.67 mm), Minuto, a petit corona
- La Fuerza - 5 1/2" × 50 (140 × 19.84 mm), Gordito, a robusto extra
- La Punta - 5 1/2" × 52 (140 × 20.64 mm), Campana, a pyramid
- Mercaderes - 6 1/2" × 48 (165 × 19.05 mm), Hermoso No. 1, a grand corona
- Muralla - 7 1/8" × 54 (181 × 21.43 mm), Rodolfos, a double pyramid
- Officios - 5 1/4" × 43 (133 × 17.07 mm), Dalias Cortas, a corona

== See also ==
- Cigar brands
