= Altadis =

Tobacco manufacturer in Spain

Altadis, S.A.
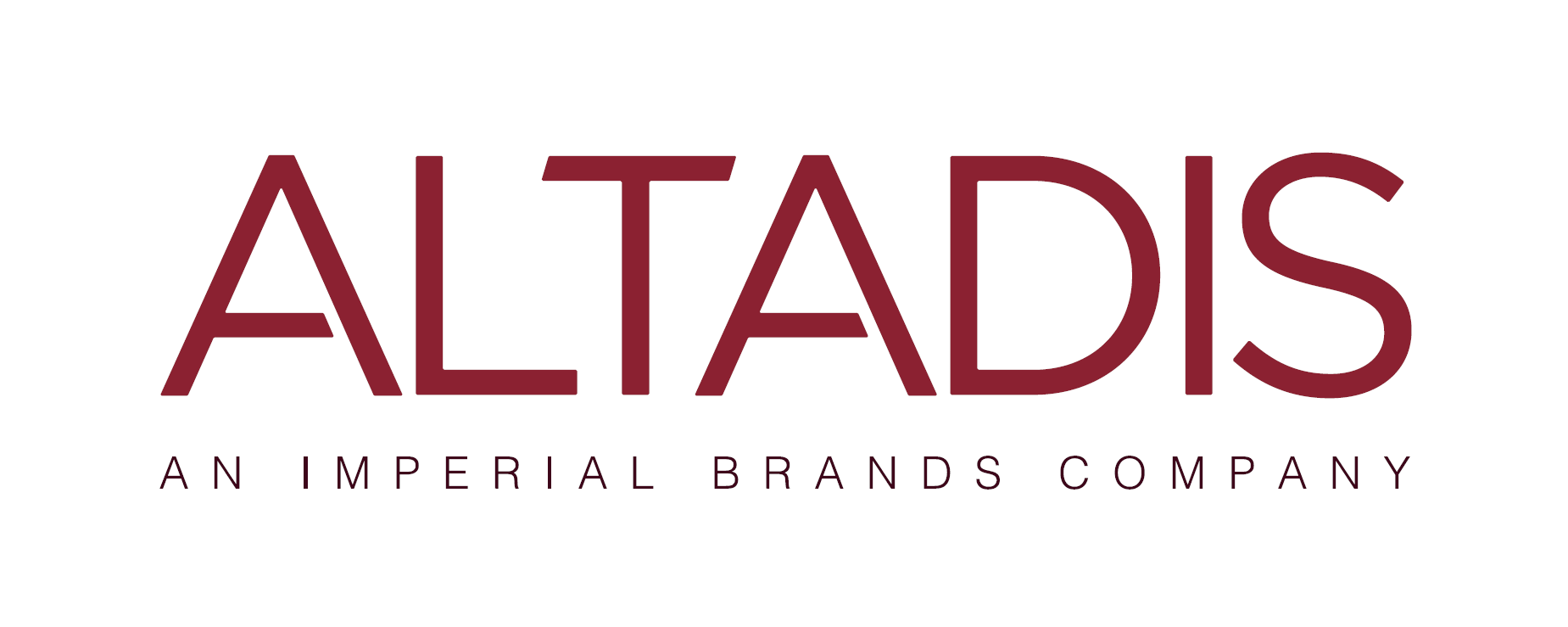
- Type: Subsidiary
- Industry: Tobacco, logistics
- Founded: 1999; 27 years ago
- Fate: Acquired by Imperial Tobacco (2008; 18 years ago)
- Headquarters: Madrid, Spain
- Area served: Worldwide
- Key people: Jean-Dominique Comolli (Chairman); Robert Dyrbus (CEO)
- Products: cigarettes, cigar
- Revenue: € 4.112 billion (2005)
- Parent: Imperial Brands
- Website: altadis.com

Altadis is a Spanish-French multinational purveyor and manufacturer of cigarettes, tobacco and cigars. It was formed via a 1999 merger between Tabacalera, the former Spanish tobacco monopoly and SEITA, the former French tobacco monopoly. Through its international holdings, including ownership of the former Consolidated Cigar Holdings and half ownership of the Cuban state tobacco monopoly, Habanos S.A., Altadis was the largest producer of mass market and premium cigars in the world, as well as the fourth largest producer of tobacco products.

The company was acquired by the British tobacco giant Imperial Tobacco (now Imperial Brands) in 2008, becoming a subsidiary of it.

== Company history ==
=== French and Spanish state monopolies ===
In 1926, France concentrated its tobacco industry into a single state-run monopoly called SEIT (Service d'Exploitation industrielle des tabacs). The production of matches (allumettes) was added to the state monopoly's purview in 1935 and the company was renamed SEITA (Société d'exploitation industrielle des tabacs et des allumettes).

Following the end of World War II, Spain similarly established a state-owned tobacco monopoly called Tabacalera, Sociedad Anonima, Compañia Gestora del Monopolio de Tabacos y Servicios Anejos, commonly known as Tabacalera.

Throughout the decades of the 1960s and 1970s, national markets were gradually opened up to the importation of foreign tobacco brands and the national tobacco monopolies of both France and Spain were weakened and gradually privatized, with SEITA employees losing status as civil servants in 1962 and the company losing both its monopoly of tobacco cultivation and tobacco sales by 1971.

=== Acquisitions ===
SEITA purchased Consolidated Cigar Holdings Inc. of Fort Lauderdale in the United States. Consolidated Cigar was a large purveyor of cigars such as the Dominican made editions of Romeo y Julieta and Montecristo.

In August 2000, Consolidated Cigar and Havatampa, owned by Tabacalera, merged to form Altadis USA.

In September 2000 Altadis purchased a 50% interest in the Cuban state tobacco monopoly, Habanos SA.

In 2003, Altadis acquired the internet seller 800-JR Cigar, Inc., one of the largest cigar retailers in the United States.

=== 2008 sale ===
On 18 July 2007, the board of Altadis backed a €16.2 billion offer for the company by Imperial Tobacco (now Imperial Brands). The acquisition was cleared by the Spanish stock market regulator on 7 November 2007, paving the way for the creation of the world's fourth largest tobacco company. The acquisition was completed on 25 February 2008 with the delisting of Altadis from the Bolsa de Madrid.

=== Sales ===
Western Europe's third largest cigarette manufacturer, Altadis produced and sold blond, regular and dark cigarettes. Its major markets included the United States, Spain and France.

In 2004, Altadis Group economic sales rose 3.9% to euro 3.518 million with a staff of 27,500 people.

=== Appointments ===
In January 2019, Altadis announced new heads of sales and consumer marketing, in the face of Paul Waller and Brad Winstead.

== Cigarettes ==
=== Blond tobacco ===
- Anfa
- Balkan Star (BS)
- Brooklyn
- Colt
- Ducados
- Fine
- Fortuna
- Fox
- Gauloises Blondes
- Iris
- Marquise
- News
- Nobel
- Popularne
- Prima
- Royale
- Smart
- Spike
- ZK (Golden Ring)

=== Black tobacco ===
- Gitanes
- Habanos
- Casa Sports
- BN
- Ducados

== Cigars ==
=== Premium ===
- Don Diego
- Flor de Copan
- H. Upmann
- José Piedra
- Longchamp
- Montecristo
- Pleiades
- Por Larrañaga
- Quintero
- Romeo y Julieta
- Santa Damiana
- VegaFina
- Siglo Limited Reserve
- Trinidad

=== Popular ===
- Antonio y Cleopatra
- Ducados Cigarros
- Dutch Masters
- Dux
- Entrefinos
- El Producto
- Farias
- Fleur de Savane
- Guantanamera
- Havanitos
- Henry Clay
- Niñas
- Phillies
- Picaduros
- Tampa Nugget

== Other ==
=== Rolling tobacco ===
- Amsterdamer
- Kennings
- Gauloises
- Picadura Ideales
- Picadura Selecta
- Picadura Fina
- Horizon

=== Logistic ===
- Logista (Note: Plus France, Portugal, and Italia divisions.)
- Régie des Tabacs
- Rouge Papier
- Nordipa
- LPM Promodern

== See also ==
- Smoking in France
