= Cohiba (cigar brand) =

Brand of Cuban cigars

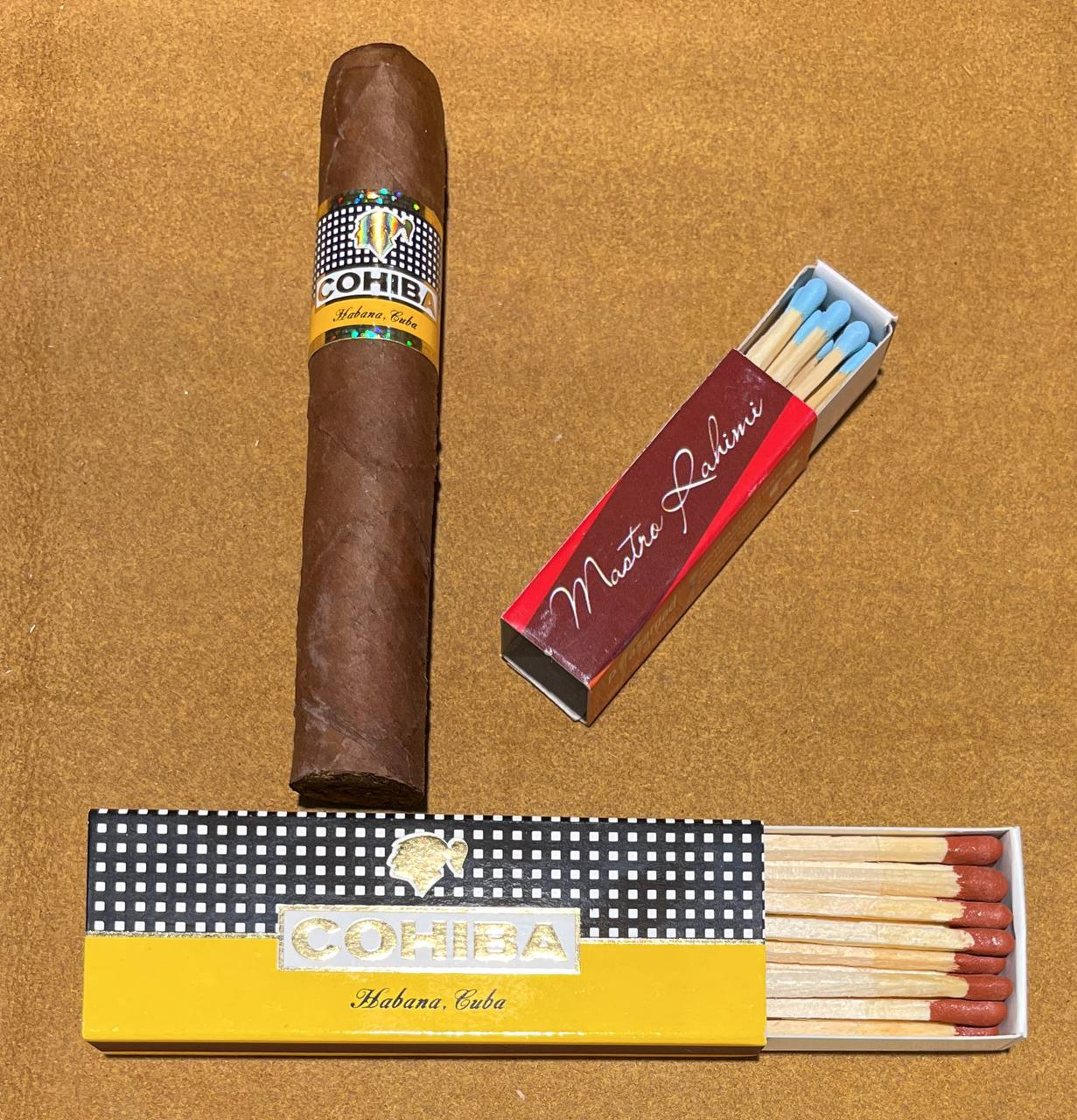
- Cohiba cigars
- Product type: Cigar
- Current owner: Imperial Brands
- Produced by: Habanos S.A.
- Country: Cuba
- Introduced: 1966; 60 years ago
- Related brands: Montecristo; Romeo y Julieta
- Markets: Cuba, Spain, Austria
- Website: habanos.com/cohiba

Cohiba is a brand for two kinds of premium cigar, one produced in Cuba for Habanos S.A., the Cuban state-owned tobacco company, and the other produced in the Dominican Republic for US-based General Cigar Company.

The Cuban brand is filled with tobacco that comes from the Vuelta Abajo region of Cuba, and which has undergone an extra fermentation process. Cuban Cohiba was established in 1966 as a limited production private brand supplied exclusively to Fidel Castro and high-level officials in the Communist Party of Cuba and Cuban government. Often given as diplomatic gifts, the Cohiba brand gradually developed a cult status. It was first released commercially for sale to the public in 1982. The Cohiba Siglo VI has received some of the highest scores in the line from blind reviews, including a 93 from Cigar Aficionado and a 90 from Blind Man's Puff.

The U.S. Cohiba brand name was registered in the United States by the General Cigar Company in 1978 and cigars using that trademark have been produced for the American market in the Dominican Republic on a large scale from 1997. This Cohiba is related to the Cuban product in name only, containing no Cuban tobacco, and thus is the only "Cohiba" that can be sold legally in the United States.

In the United Kingdom, Cohiba cigars are distributed through specialist tobacconists, including C.Gars Ltd, one of the country’s largest cigar retailers as well as FDLH.

== Cuban Cohiba ==
=== History ===
Cuban Cohiba's origins trace back to the middle 1960s, when a bodyguard of Fidel Castro shared some of his private supply of cigars made by a local artisan named Eduardo Rivera. These cigars pleased Castro so much that a special production of the unbranded blend, produced under tight security, was made for Castro and other top government officials.

As Castro himself recalled the tale in 1994:

"I used to see the man smoking a very aromatic, very nice cigar, and I asked him what brand he was smoking. He told me that it was a special blend, but that it came from a friend who makes cigars and he gave them to him. I said, let's find this man. I tried the cigar, and I found it so good that we got in touch with him and asked him how he made it. Then we set up the house (the El Laguito factory), and he explained the blend of tobacco he used. He told which leaves he used from which tobacco plantations. He also told us about the wrappers he used and other things. We found a group of cigar makers. We gave them the material and that is how the factory was founded. Now Cohiba is known all over the world."

The production of special cigars for top officials under conditions of tight security was given extra impetus by fears of ongoing CIA assassination efforts against Fidel and Raúl Castro and Che Guevara. The technical services department of the agency is now in fact known to have worked on the development of exploding cigars as a means of assassination from the early 1960s.

Before the distinctive black-and-yellow band of the Cohiba became a badge of plutocracy, it was the favored smoke of Cuba's revolutionary elite [...] Soon these long, elegant cigars became as much a part of the revolutionary look as facial hair and military fatigues, thanks to Che Guevara's pronouncement that he had never smoked a better cigar.

— Newsweek

The Cuban Cohiba brand was formally launched in 1968 at the direction of Cubatabaco, the Cuban state tobacco marketing bureau. The head of Cubatabaco asked Avelino Lara, head of the El Laguito factory, to create a new super-premium blend which differed from all previously existing Cuban cigars. During the first few years of production only a few thousand boxes were produced annually, reserved for the use of high government officials and frequently given away as diplomatic gifts.

The Cuban Cohiba brand was launched as a premium cigar brand into markets outside of the U.S. in 1982 in conjunction with the 1982 World Cup held in Spain. At the time of its first public launch, the Cohiba marque consisted of just three vitolas (sizes): the Panetela, the Corona Especial, and the Lancero. In 1989 three more vitolas were added: the Robusto, the Exquisito, and the Espléndido. These first six are now collectively known as the company's Línea Clásica (classic line).

In 1992 Habanos SA launched the first sizes in what it calls the Línea 1492, commemorating Christopher Columbus and his voyage to the Americas, with each size named for a century since Columbus' discovery. The initial launch included the Siglo I, Siglo II, Siglo III, Siglo IV, and Siglo V, with a Siglo VI added in 2002.

Besides regular production, Habanos SA regularly releases limited release Cohíba cigars for such events as the annual Habanos Festival, brand anniversaries, and their annual Edición Limitada (limited edition) release of special sizes of their various cigar brands wrapped in a darker vintage leaf. In 2007, Habanos released a new line of maduro-wrapped Cohibas, called "Maduro 5," in three sizes.

The Cuban Cohiba brand also carries two machine-made extensions cigarillos: the Mini and the Club.

Habanos SA have used their Cohiba brand name for non-cigar products, manufacturing Cohiba cigarettes since 1987 and Extra Cohiba Cognac since 1999.

In 1992 approximately 3.4 million cigars were produced in Cuba bearing the Cohiba label, out of a total Cuban cigar export production of approximately 60 million pieces.

=== Tobaccos ===
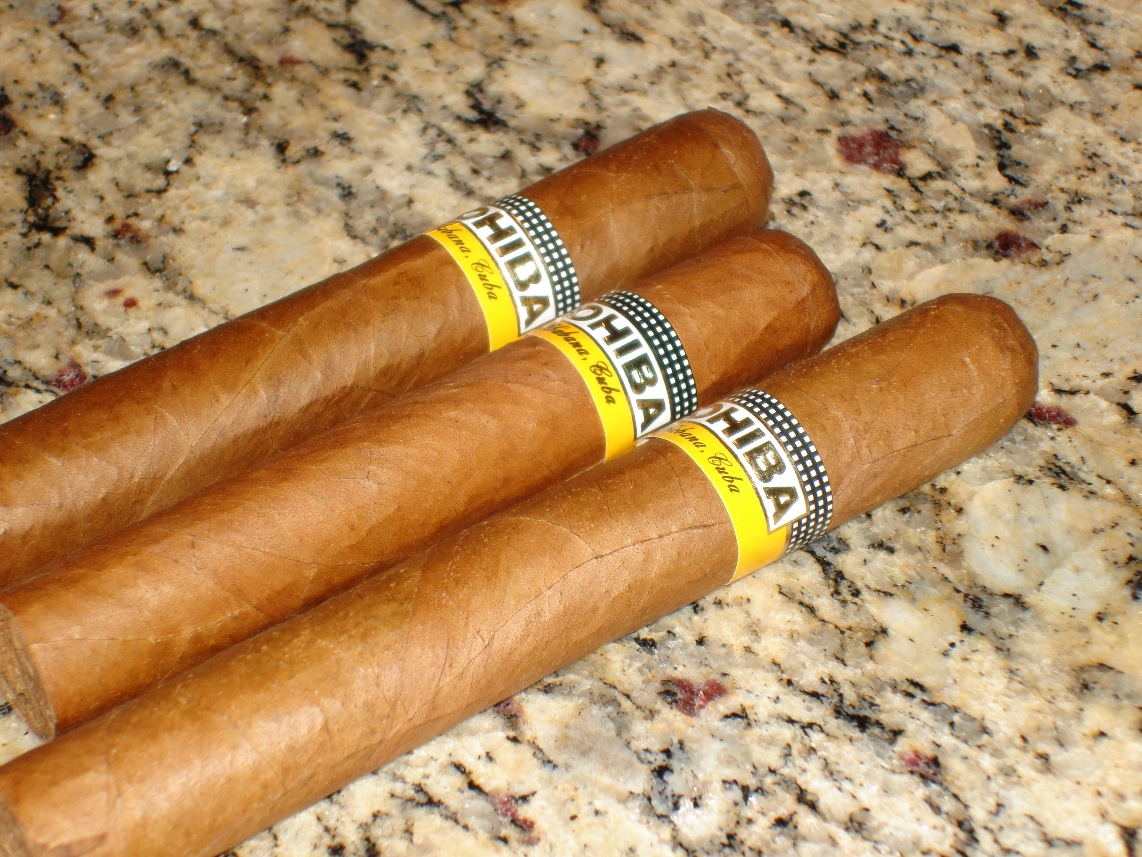
Three authentic Cuban-made Cohiba Cigars

Cuban Cohibas have historically been known to use some of the finest cigar tobacco available in Cuba. The tobacco for Cohiba is selected from the finest Vegas Finas de Primera (first-class tobacco fields) in the San Luis and San Juan y Martinez zones of the Vuelta Abajo region of Pinar del Río Province. In 1992 just 10 carefully selected fields totaling about 700 acres were used for production of the Cohiba brand, their exact location a carefully guarded trade secret. The production of these fields is further selected for quality, with the output of just five of these fields used in Cohiba production in an average year.

The tobacco used to fill the cigars is unique among Cuban brands owing to a special third fermentation in wooden barrels at the El Laguito factory, aimed at producing a smoother flavor than other cigars. Originally all Cohibas were made at the El Laguito factory, a mansion located on the outskirts of Havana converted into a cigar-rolling school for women in 1961. Production of some Cohiba vitolas was later expanded to the Partagas factory in Havana, which manufactures its Cohiba product from pre-blended tobacco received from El Laguito.

Cohiba cigars tend to be medium to full-bodied in flavor.

=== Vitolas in the Cohiba line ===
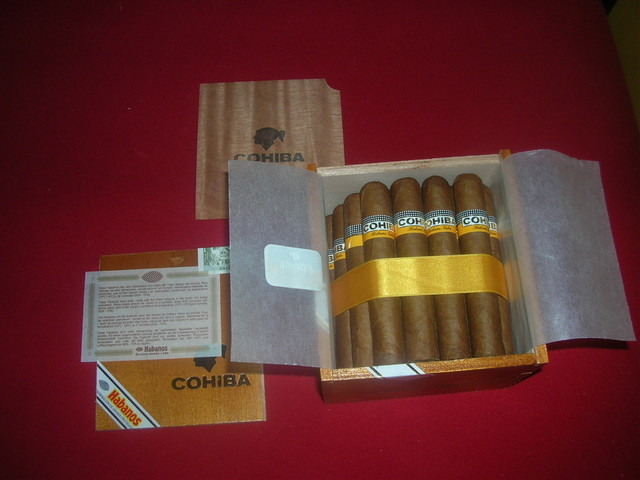
A slide lid cabinet box of Cohiba Robustos

The following list of vitolas de salida (commercial vitolas) within the Cohiba marque lists their size in inches and ring gauge in sixty-fourths of an inch (with a metric conversion), their vitolas de galera (factory vitolas), and their common name in American cigar slang.

The La Línea Clásica Series

- Corona Especial – 6″ × 38 (152.5 mm × 15 mm), Laguito No. 2, a panetela
- Espléndido – 7″ × 47 (178 mm × 18.5 mm), Julieta No. 2, a churchill
- Exquisito – 4 7/8″ × 33 (124 mm × 13 mm), Seoane, a small panetela
- Lancero – 7 1/2″ × 38 (190.5 mm × 15 mm), Laguito No. 1, a long panetela
- Panetela – 4 1/2″ × 26 (114.5 mm × 10.5 mm), Laguito No. 3, a small panetela
- Robusto – 4 7/8″ × 50 (124 mm × 20 mm), Robusto, a robusto

The La Línea 1492 Series

- Siglo I – 4″ × 40 (101.5 mm × 16 mm), Perla, a petit corona
- Siglo II – 5 1/8″ × 42 (130 mm × 16.5 mm), Mareva, a petit corona
- Siglo III – 6 1/8″ × 42 (155.5 mm × 16.5 mm), Corona Grande, a long corona
- Siglo IV – 5 5/8″ × 46 (143 mm × 18.5 mm), Corona Gorda, a grand corona
- Siglo V – 6 3/4″ × 43 (171.5 mm × 17 mm), Dalia, a lonsdale
- Siglo VI – 5 7/8″ × 52 (149 mm × 20.5 mm), Cañonazo, a robusto extra

The Maduro 5 Series

- Genios – 5 1/2″ × 52 (139.5 mm × 20.5 mm), Estupendos, a robusto extra
- Mágicos – 4 1/2″ × 52 (114.5 mm × 20.5 mm), Mágicos, a petit robusto
- Secretos – 4 3/8″ × 40 (111 mm × 16 mm), Reyes, a petit corona

The Behike Series

- BHK 52 (20.64 mm) ring gauge × 4 1/2 in (119 mm) in length
- BHK 54 (21.43 mm) band gauge × 5 1/2 in (144 mm) length
- BHK 56 (22.23 mm) band gauge × 6 1/2 in (166 mm) length

Edición Limitada Releases

- Double Corona (2003) – 7 5/8″ × 49 (193.5 mm × 19.5 mm), Prominente, a double corona
- Sublime (2004) – 6 1/2″ × 54 (165 mm × 21.5 mm), Sublime, a double robusto
- Pirámide (2001, re-released in 2006) – 6 1/8″ × 52 (155.5 mm × 20.5 mm), Pirámide, a pyramid

Special Releases

- Millennium Reserve Pirámide – 6 1/8″ × 52 (155.5 mm × 20.5 mm), Pirámide, a pyramid
- Behike – 7 1/2″ × 52 (190.5 mm × 20.5 mm), Behike, a double robusto

== General Cigar Company's Cohiba ==
With the nationalization of the Cuban tobacco industry along with other businesses after the Cuban Revolution, many cigar makers fled the island and began growing tobacco in the Dominican Republic, Honduras, and Nicaragua, taking the brand names of their cigars with them. The Cuban industry contended that the brand names were the property of the nation, however, and parallel use of the same brand name resulted. Additionally, post-revolutionary trademark uncertainty and a U.S. embargo against all Cuban goods made possible the relaunch of other Cuban brand names by private companies in other countries.

The General Cigar Company, a private firm having no relation whatsoever to the Cuban cigar industry, first registered the name Cohiba in the United States in 1978 and subsequently began selling cigars under the Cohiba brand in that country in the 1980s. Manufacture and sales of General Cigar's brand was significantly expanded during the 1990s cigar boom, with General Cigar's product known colloquially as "Red Dot Cohiba," owing to the red dot in the middle of the "O" in "Cohiba" on its bands and boxes.

In response to General Cigar's use of the Cohiba name, Cubatabaco, the government-run company in charge of cigars, and half-owner of Habanos SA along with Altadis SA, launched a long-running legal campaign to have General Cigar's trademark revoked.

The legal dispute was resolved on June 19, 2006, when the U. S. Supreme Court denied Cubatabaco's petition. As a result, the February 2005 decision of the U. S. 2nd Circuit Court of Appeals (Docket #04-2527), which confirmed General Cigar Company's exclusive ownership of the Cohiba trademark in the United States, is final. The General Cigar-made Cohiba cigars now have a disclaimer on boxes that they are not affiliated in any way with the Cuban brand.

However, the United States government, in an amicus curiae brief filed in the Supreme Court, acknowledged that Cubatabaco could request U.S. government permission for judicial protection of the brand from the Department of the Treasury's Office of Foreign Assets Control, which administers the U.S. embargo. Cubatabaco has stated that they intend to pursue this course of action.

In a November 1992 interview, director of Cubatabaco Francisco Padrón indicated that in the event the American embargo of Cuban products were ended, return of the Cohiba brand name to Cubatabaco would be a prerequisite for any future distribution agreement with General Cigar Co. "The first condition is that they must pass the brand name to us. This is the first condition. Immediately. If not, forget about it," Padrón declared.

On February 25, 2015, the U.S. Supreme Court handed Cuba a victory over its cigar litigation. The U.S. Supreme Court declined to intervene in a long-running battle between a U.S. and Cuban company over the Cohiba cigar trademark. By refusing to hear an appeal, the country's highest court leaves intact a ruling in favor of the Cuban firm.

Due to a U.S. trade embargo with Cuba, Cubatabaco cannot sell its Cohiba cigars in the United States while they are sold worldwide and in Cuba. U.S. company General Cigar sells its Dominican Republic-produced Cohiba cigars in the US. The legal dispute is over whether the Cuban company has the right to challenge General Cigar's trademark in the US, despite the embargo, as reported by Agence France Presse.

General Cigar obtained a U.S. registration for Cohiba in 1981 and a second registration in 1995. Cubatabaco had the trademark registered in Cuba in 1972. In the late 70s, it began registering the logo outside Cuba – in 115 countries – but was prohibited from selling merchandise in the U.S. by the Cuban Assets Control Regulation (CACR). In the case, Cubatabaco argued the CACR not only prevented the company from selling in the US, but also prevented it from challenging General Cigar's registrations.

In June 2014, the U.S. Court of Appeals for the Federal Circuit ruled in favor of the Cuban company by giving it standing to seek a cancellation of the registrations that block its own ability to register trademarks. The case will now move forward to the Trademark Trial and Appeal Board.

The challenge comes two months after President Obama announced in December that he planned to loosen some of the US-Cuba restrictions, including the easing of the decades-long trade embargo.

Under an easing of travel restrictions between the U.S. and Cuba, American visitors will be able to buy and take home as many as 100 cigars.

In 2023, the first-ever box pressed Cohiba called "Rivieria" consisting of six-region blend was released in the US

Cohiba Rivieria made its inaugural debut at a Kentucky Derby 2023 week event featuring Bourbon expert Tom Fischer and Cohiba National Brand Ambassador and cigar blender Sean Williams.

== See also ==
- Cigar brands
- Cohiba (cigarette)
