= Colt (cigarette) =

Cigarette brand

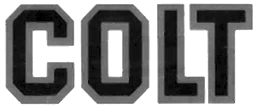
- Product type: Cigarette
- Produced by: Philip Morris USA in the United States, Imperial Tobacco Finland Oy, a subsidiary of Imperial Tobacco in Finland
- Introduced: 1964; 62 years ago
- Markets: See Markets

Colt is a cigarette brand that was owned and manufactured by Philip Morris USA. In Finland, it is owned and manufactured by Imperial Tobacco Finland Oy, a subsidiary of Imperial Tobacco.

== History ==
An old Finnish pack of Colt cigarettes, with both Finnish and Swedish text warnings at the bottom of the pack

Launched in 1964, Colt was originally a tobacco factory. In 1976, the company merged with Oy Rettig-Strengberg Ab. in Finland. The brand was also manufactured and sold in the United States by Philip Morris USA.

Besides cigarettes, Colt also produced smoking paraphernalia, such as cigarette lighters.

== Sport sponsorship ==
Colt cigarettes sponsored the Finnish rally driver Henri Toivonen from 1979 until 1985, as well as the team he drove, called Colt Racing Team.

== Markets ==
Colt is mainly sold in Finland, but also was or still is sold in Switzerland, Greece, Belarus, Russia, Indonesia, the United States, Brazil Japan, and Argentina and South Africa.

== See also ==
- Tobacco smoking
- Tobacco
- Cigarette
