= Romeo y Julieta (cigar) =

Brand of Cuban cigars

- Product type: Cigars
- Current owner: Imperial Brands
- Produced by: Habanos S.A. Altadis
- Country: Cuba; Dominican Republic
- Introduced: 1875; 151 years ago
- Related brands: Cohiba; Montecristo
- Website: habanos.com/romeoyjulieta/

Romeo y Julieta is a brand of premium cigars, currently owned by Imperial Brands. The brand is currently owned by two Imperial Brands subsidiaries, Habanos S.A. in Cuba and Altadis in the Dominican Republic.

== History ==
The Romeo y Julieta marque was established in 1875 by Inocencio Alvarez and Manin García. The brand is the Spanish name for Shakespeare's famous tragedy Romeo and Juliet.

Between 1885 and 1900, the brand won numerous awards at different tasting exhibitions. The brand was acquired by José "Pepin" Rodriguez Fernández, former head of the Cabañas factory in Havana, and his firm, Rodríguez, Argüelles y Cia, in 1903. Rodriguez constantly travelled across Europe and the Americas, actively promoting his brand, and entering his horse, the aptly named Julieta, in racing events across the world.

As a result of his salesmanship, the brand became exceptionally popular around the world among wealthy customers, many of whom demanded personalized bands for their cigars. At its height, as many as 2000 personalized cigar bands were produced for customers. The brand was also known at this time for specializing in figurado cigars (shaped cigars, such as ones that taper — any cigar that does not have straight, parallel sides) such as perfectos and pirámides, with over a thousand such shapes believed to have been in production.

Sir Winston Churchill was perhaps the brand's most famous devotee. The flagship vitola of the brand is named in his honour, a long 7" by 47 ring gauge cigar known as the Churchill.

After Rodriguez's death in 1954 at 88 years of age and the revolution and subsequent nationalization of the tobacco industry, the brand was moved to La Romana in the Dominican Republic, where production of a Romeo y Julieta cigar for the American market continues today under the direction of Altadis U.S.A. The Cuban government nationalized the brand and still produces and distributes it worldwide as one of its top-selling global brands.

== Products ==
=== Vitolas in the Romeo y Julieta Line ===
The following list of vitolas de salida (commercial vitolas) within the Romeo y Julieta marque lists their size and ring gauge in Imperial (and Metric), their vitolas de galera (factory vitolas), and their common name in American cigar slang.

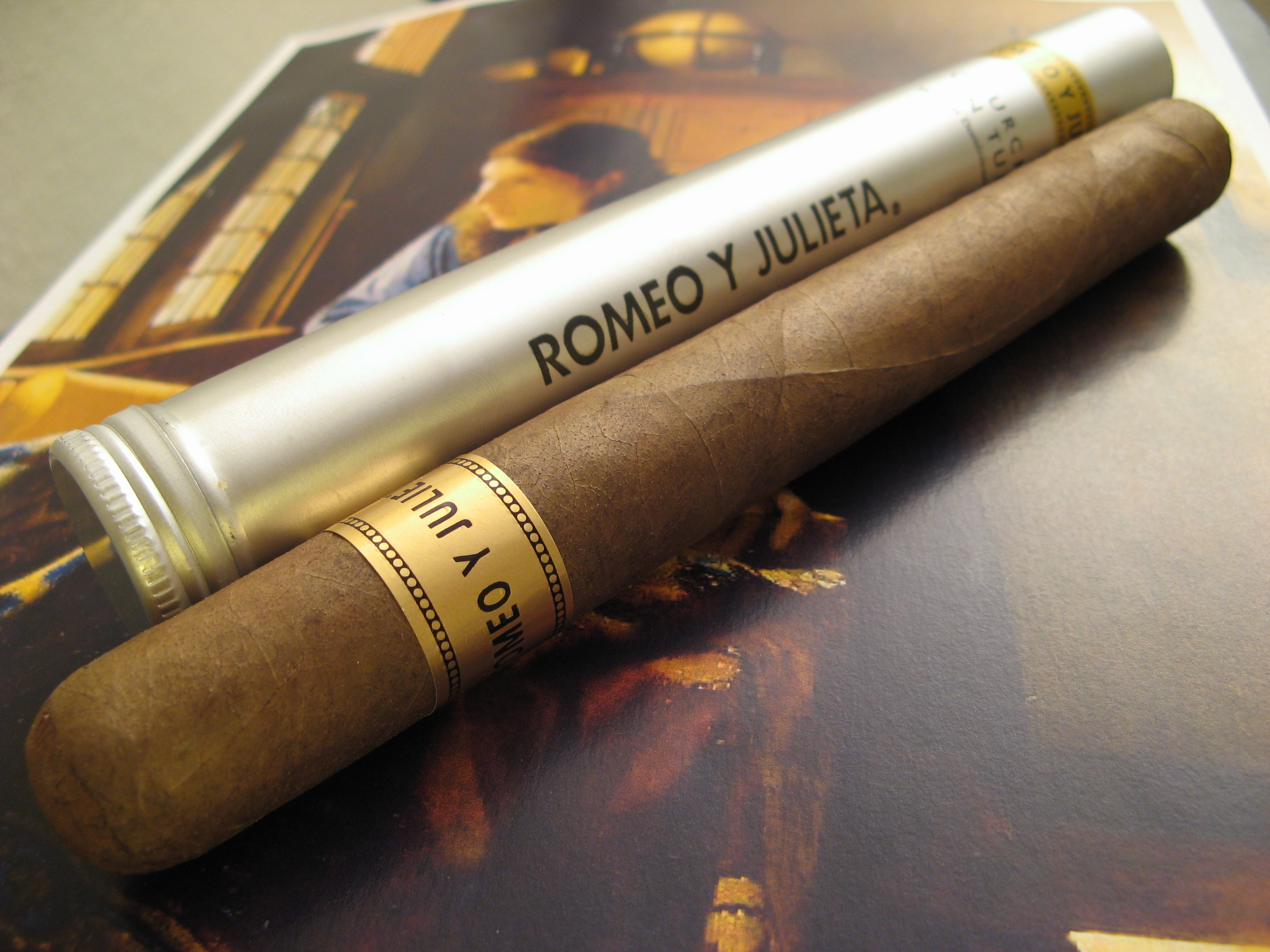
Dominican Romeo y Julieta

- Belicoso - 5 1/2" × 52 (140 × 20.64 mm), Campana, a belicoso
- Belvedere - 4 7/8" × 39 (124 × 15.48 mm), Belvedere, a short panetela
- Cazadores - 6 3/8" x 44 (162 x 17.46 mm), a lonsdale
- Cedro de Luxe No. 1 - 6 1/2" × 42 (165 × 16.67 mm), Cervantes, a lonsdale
- Cedro de Luxe No. 2 - 5 5/8" × 42 (143 × 16.67 mm), Corona, a corona
- Cedro de Luxe No. 3 - 5 1/8" × 42 (130 × 16.67 mm), Mareva, a petit corona
- Churchill - 7" × 47 (178 × 18.65 mm), Julieta No. 2, a churchill
- Corona - 5 5/8" × 42 (143 × 16.67 mm), Corona, a corona
- Coronita en Cedro - 5 1/8" × 40 (130 × 15.88 mm), Petit Cetro, a petit corona
- Exhibición No. 3 - 5 5/8" × 46 (143 × 18.26 mm), Corona Gorda, a grand corona
- Exhibición No. 4 - 5" × 48 (127 × 19.05 mm), Hermoso No. 4, a corona extra
- Petit Corona - 5 1/8" × 42 (130 × 16.67 mm), Mareva, a petit corona
- Petit Julieta - 3 7/8" × 30 (98 × 11.91 mm), Entreacto, a small panetela
- Petit Princess - 4" × 40 (102 × 15.88 mm), Perlas, a petit corona
- Regalía de Londres - 4 5/8" × 40 (117 × 15.88 mm), Coronita, a petit corona
- Romeo No. 1 - 5 1/2" × 40 (140 × 15.88 mm), Crema, a corona
- Romeo No. 2 - 5 1/8" × 42 (130 × 16.67 mm), Petit Corona, a petit corona
- Romeo No. 3 - 4 5/8" × 40 (117 × 15.88 mm), Coronita, a petit corona
- Short Churchill - 4 7/8" × 50 (124 × 19.84 mm), Robusto, a robusto
- Sport Largo - 4 5/8" × 35 (117 × 13.89 mm), Sport, a short panetela
- Wide Churchill - 5 1/8" × 55 (130 × 21.83 mm) Montesco

Edición Limitada Releases

- Exhibición No. 2 (2000) - 7 5/8" × 49 (194 × 19.45 mm), Prominente, a double corona
- Robusto (2001) - 4 7/8" × 50 (124 × 19.84 mm), Robusto, a robusto
- Hermoso No. 1 (2003) - 6 1/2" × 48 (165 × 19.05 mm), Hermoso No. 1, a grand corona
- Hermoso No. 2 (2004) - 6 1/8" × 48 (156 × 19.05 mm), Hermoso No. 2, a grand corona
- Petit Pirámide (2005) - 5" × 50 (127 × 19.84 mm), Petit Pirámide, a petit pyramid
- Escudo (2007) - 5 1/2" × 50 (141 × 19.84 mm) Gordito, a robusto extra
- Duke (2009) - 5 1/2" × 54 (140 × 21.43 mm) Duke, a robusto extra

A Romeo Y Julieta Cigar Case

=== Cigar Products ===
- Ashtrays
- Porcelain Jugs
- Cigar Cases
- Cigar Cutters
- Cigar Lighters
- Cigar Humidors

== See also ==
- Romeo y Julieta (cigarette)
- Cigar brands
- Gerald Garson, a judge bribed, in part, with Romeo y Julieta cigars

== Bibliography ==
- Nee, Min Ron - An Illustrated Encyclopaedia of Post-Revolution Havana Cigars (2003, Reprinted: 2005), ISBN 3-9809308-2-3
