= Cubatabaco =

Cuban state tobacco company

- Industry: Tobacco industry
- Headquarters: Cuba
- Website: www.empleadoracubatabaco.cu

Cubatabaco, short for Empresa Cubana del Tabaco, is the Cuban state tobacco company. The company was formed in 1962, after the Cuban tobacco industry had been nationalized by Fidel Castro's socialist government.

Cubatabaco handled all production and distribution of Cuban tobacco products both locally and internationally until 1994, when the firm of Habanos S.A. was formed to export cigars and cigarettes worldwide.

== See also ==
- List of cigar brands
