= Box-pressed =

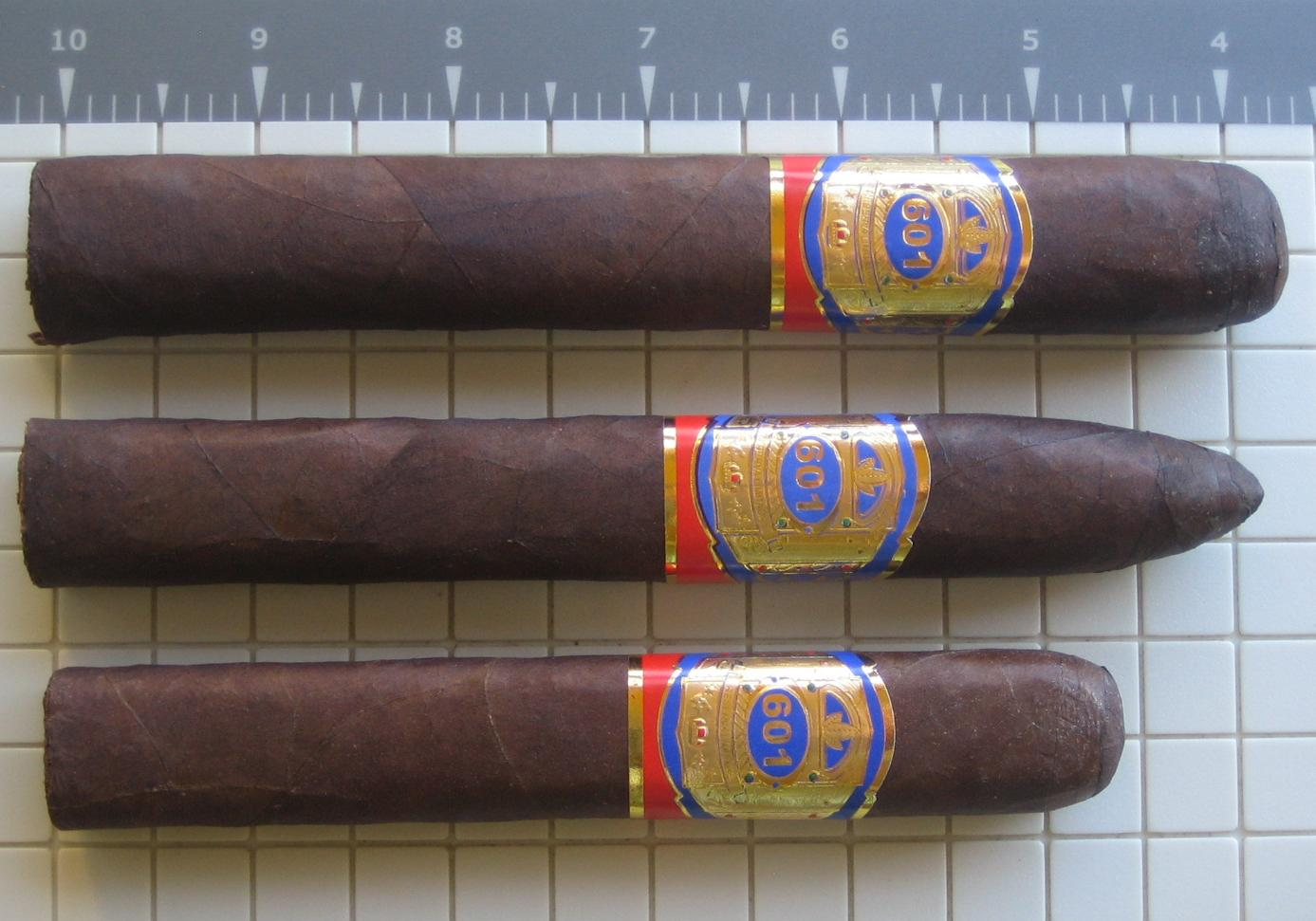
"601" Box-pressed Maduro cigars

Box-pressed (or square-pressed) cigars are usually packed in two layers in a wide flat cigar box that has an attached flip or hinged lid, and is usually made of paper-covered wood or cardboard (as opposed to a plain-wood cabinet). The sides of box-pressed cigars will be gently pressed (so the cigars become squarer) prior to packing; this is because the box is marginally narrower than it would otherwise be to hold the same number of the round cigars, which ensures they are tightly packed and reduces the size of the box. Box-pressing is also a technique that some say gives the cigar a better draw and burn.
