= Vuelta Abajo =

Geographic region in Pinar del Río Province, Cuba

Coordinates: 22°25′N 83°42′W

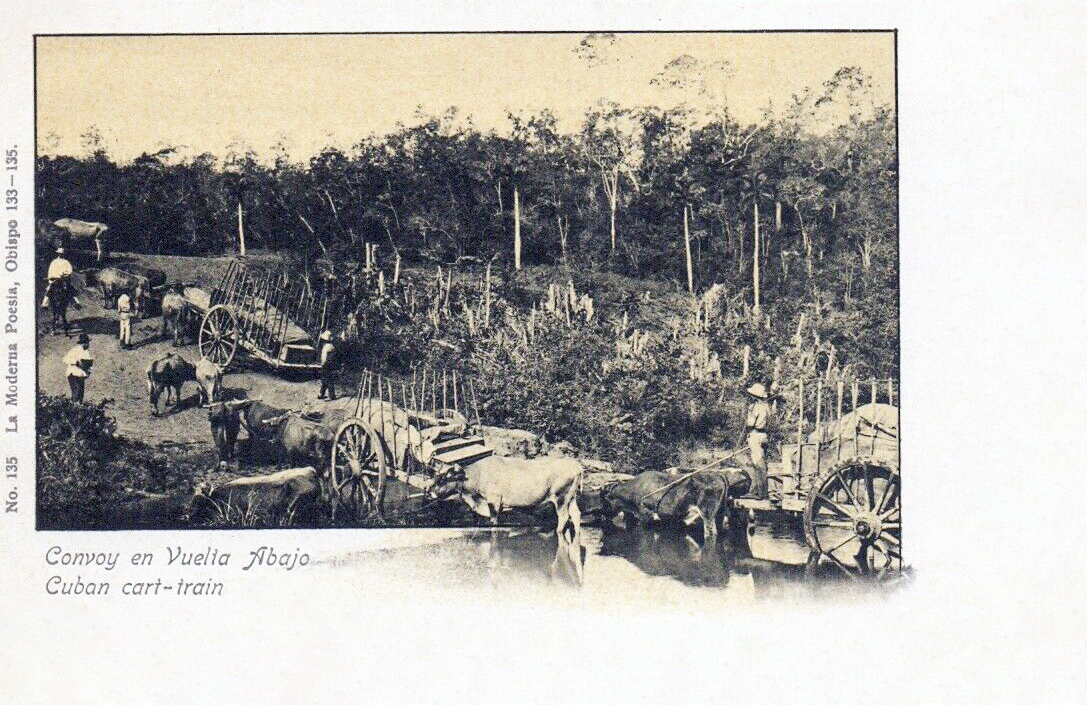
Postcard of Vuelta Abajo

Vuelta Abajo (or Vueltabajo, literally: The lower roundtrip) is a geographic region in the Pinar del Río Province of Cuba. It lies in the extreme western part of the island, bordered on the north by the Sierra de los Órganos mountains. It is one of the five tobacco regions of Cuba.

== Overview ==
A great deal of tobacco is grown in the region, and "Vuelta Abajo" can also refer to the high quality type of cigar tobacco from Pinar del Rio in general. The tobacco industry in this district dates from around 1830. The district itself is 90 miles (140 km) long and 10 miles (16 km) wide. The tobacco grown in Vuelta Abajo is considered by many tobacco enthusiasts to be the best tobacco in the world. The Semi-Vuelta, Partido, Remedios and Oriente areas are the other main centres of production in Cuba.
