= Romeo y Julieta =

Romeo y Julieta can refer to:

- The Spanish name for the Shakespeare play Romeo and Juliet
  - Romeo y Julieta (TV series), an Argentine soap opera based on the play
- Romeo y Julieta (cigar), two brands of Cuban and Dominican cigars
- Romeo y Julieta (cigarette), a brand of Cuban cigarettes
- Romeo and Juliet (1943 film), a Mexican film
