= Cohiba =

Cohiba may refer to:

- Cohiba (cigar brand)
- Cohiba (cigarette)
