= Horses in Cuba =

Equines in Cuban culture and history

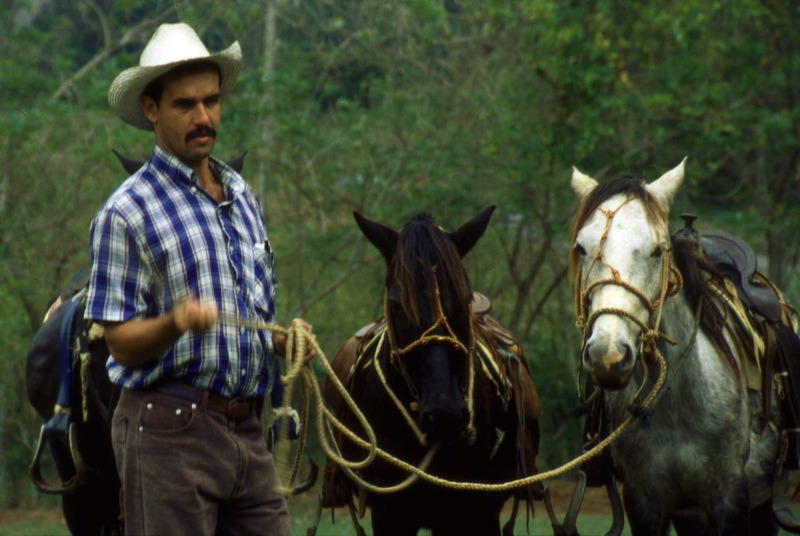
Three horses and a 'vaquero in Cuba, 2005

Horses (Spanish: caballo) arrived in Cuba with the conquistador (conquering) troops and the first Spanish colonists accompanying Diego Velázquez de Cuéllar in 1511. Horses were a decisive factor in Spanish victories against the native Arawaks of Cuba. And they were quickly bred locally, first as a military animal, then as a mount for working with cattle. Conflicts with the native Americans led to the enactment of a local law prohibiting them from owning and riding horses. It remained in force for a century, before being repealed to allow the recruitment of non-European Vaqueros.

Horse racing was introduced by the Americans at the beginning of the 20th century. The country then began to motorize, but the economic sanctions it suffered as a result of its conflict with the United States, and in particular its fuel supply problems, led to a resurgence in the use of harnessed horse-drawn transport and ploughing with horses from the 1990s onwards. Horses are also present in the tourism sector.

Fourteen breeds of horse are bred in Cuba, including four local breeds. Like other countries in this geographical region, the island of Cuba is a zone of active circulation of the West Nile virus and diseases transmitted to horses by ticks, babesiosis and Q fever. The animal is an integral part of local culture, particularly cinema.

== History ==
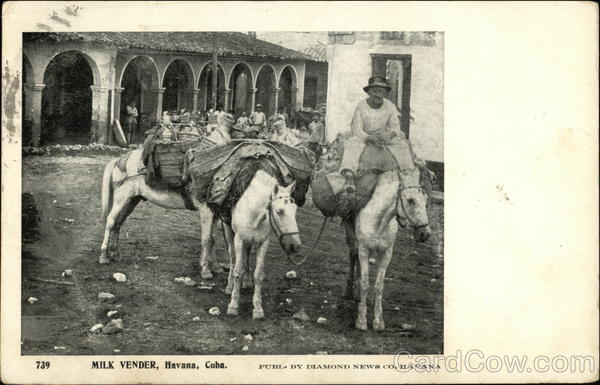
Milk salesman in Havana, 1904

Prehistoric fossils of wild horses have been found all over the Americas. The horse disappeared around 10,000 BC, perhaps due to hunting pressure from human populations.

European explorers and colonists reintroduced domesticated horses in the 15th century.

=== First arrivals ===
Cuba's native population was quickly won over by the Spanish colonists, and horse and cattle breeding quickly grew. The first horses, a dozen or so, were landed in 1511 by the ships of Diego Velázquez de Cuéllar from the island of Hispaniola, the first to be colonized by the Spanish. Velázquez de Cuéllar himself declares that the purpose of these few horses was to "impose respect" on the local population, to make the conquest easier. Like the mules and donkeys, these animals were destined for military use.

Conqueror Pánfilo de Narváez was the only real rider among the Spanish colonists who arrived in 1511. The expensive mare he rode was luxuriously caparisoned and carried a bard adorned with small bells. According to chronicler Herrera, the Arawaks were highly impressed by this mare, "very frightened to see such a large animal that they had never seen before", carrying a man and performing movements under his control. The presence of this rider and his mount proved decisive in the Spaniards' first victories in Cuba, and against Arawak raids. The Cuban Indians had no tradition of using working animals, either to carry or to pull. Perhaps they initially perceived riders as forming a single entity with their horses.

More horses arrived on the island of Cuba over time, but some of them escaped human control, becoming semi-wild again. In contact with these masterless horses, the Arawaks lost their initial fear of these large animals, learned to control and use them, and eventually became excellent riders. The cacique (tribal chief) Hatuey, fleeing the oppression of his people on the island of Hispaniola, landed in Cuba and for a time led raids targeting Spanish horses. This led to the enactment of a local law strictly prohibiting natives from owning a horse and saddle, and from practicing horseback riding. This law remained in force for over a century in Cuba, until the lack of European agricultural labor and the demand for Vaqueros to work with cattle led to its abolition.

=== Breeding becomes widespread ===
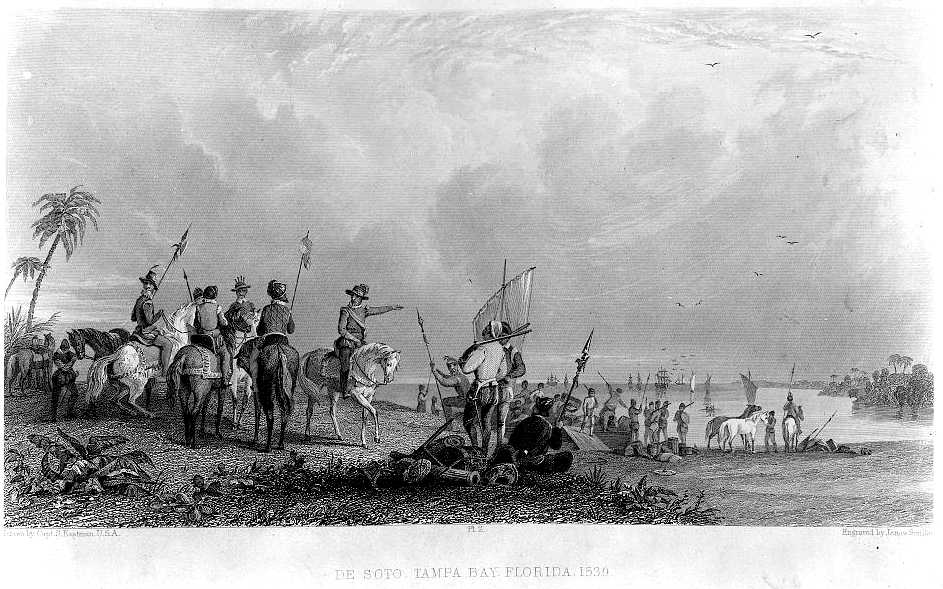
Hernando de Soto at Tampa Bay in 1539, drawing by Seth Eastman in 1853. The horses for his expedition came from Cuba.

Horses were initially rare, expensive and difficult to obtain. Hernán Cortés' military campaign in Cuba, then in Mexico-Tenochtitlan (with sixteen Cuban horses taken), made the Spanish crown realize the strategic importance of cavalry in these victories, facilitating the importation of horses. Horse breeding was quickly introduced. The conquerors gave preference to horses born in the Antilles for their expeditions, due to their lower cost and resistance to local diseases.

When Narváez set out on his campaign to explore Florida in 1527, he managed to obtain all his horses from Cuba. Hernando de Soto had no trouble finding local horses in 1539. He called on a breeder, Vasco Porcallo de Figueroa, and found 50 horses with him. On his arrival in Santiago de Cuba, during Whitsuntide 1538, he was greeted by more than 150 caparisoned riders who escorted him to Havana. According to Garcilaso de la Vega, de Soto tested the bravery of his men by involving them in bullfighting on Cuban mounts. However, this type of training was undoubtedly an integral part of the military training of the habaneros, the inhabitants of Havana.

Cuba established itself as a horse-breeding center on the American continent for 400 years, with cattle-breeding managed by riders forming the basis of the Cuban economy until the early 19th century. Every guajiro, a resident of the Cuban countryside, is required to own at least one horse. Horses are generally used for riding and to pull vehicles for transporting people and materials. They are not generally used for agricultural work. Cuban horses are also driven, but donkeys and mules are preferred for these purposes, especially in hilly areas.

Dutch draft horses, Thoroughbreds, hobby horses and Acadian ambleurs were imported to the island as part of the triangular trade, but the Iberian horse continues to make up the majority of the local herd, most used locally for ranch work. Unlike neighboring islands, Cuba has no populations of cimarrones.

=== After the abolition of slavery ===
With the abolition of slavery in the 1880s, former Cuban slaves began to claim ownership of horses. White administrator J. S. Murray, who arrived at the Cuban plantation Soledad in 1884 on behalf of new owners E. Atkins and Company, declared that "nearly every negro on the estate owns a horse, and that they are, in one way or another, a constant source of trouble", starting a campaign to force black workers to get rid of their mounts. The campaign was probably a failure, as not only did the horse embody male authority, but it seemed difficult to persuade workers to give up riding and go to work on foot.

In 1891, Cuba was home to an estimated 531 416 horses and 43 309 mules.

=== Since the 20th century ===
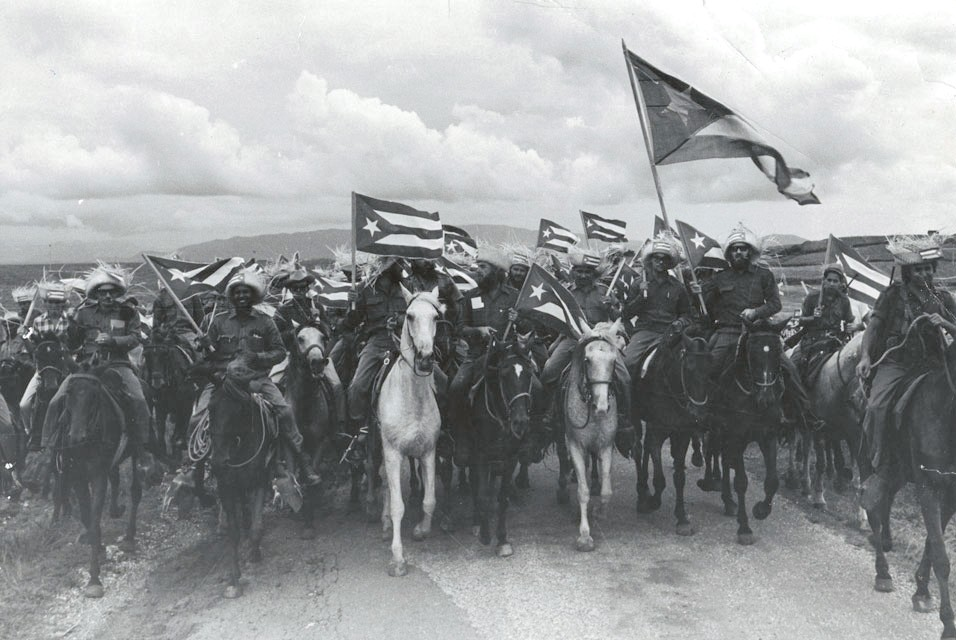
Riders in the 1959 Cuban Revolution

In 1906, while Cuba was under U.S. government, the Cuban Racing Association attempted to introduce equestrian sport as a tourist activity for bettors and breeders. Curly Brown's Oriental Park racecourse opened in Havana in 1915, but in the midst of World War I, it struggled to function, despite efforts to attract wealthy tourists. It did, however, attract a few wealthy American racehorse owners, who were able to take advantage of the legal authorization to drink alcohol in Cuba even while Prohibition was enforced in the United States. Due to poor management, the racecourse deteriorated, the 1925 racing season was narrowly saved by a Canadian-born businessman, John McEntee Bowman.

In the 1940s, Cuba was home to around one horse for every seven inhabitants. There is no specific state support for breeding. In 1961, based on FAO data, the horse population in Cuba was estimated at 400 000 head. Estimates of the horse population at the end of the 20th century vary, but all point to a sharp decline in the horse population during the 1980s, probably due to increasing access to motor vehicles and urbanization. Agreements with the Soviet Union guaranteed the import of tractors, motor vehicles and parts at low cost, limiting the use of animals. By 1990, the number of horses had fallen to around 235 000.

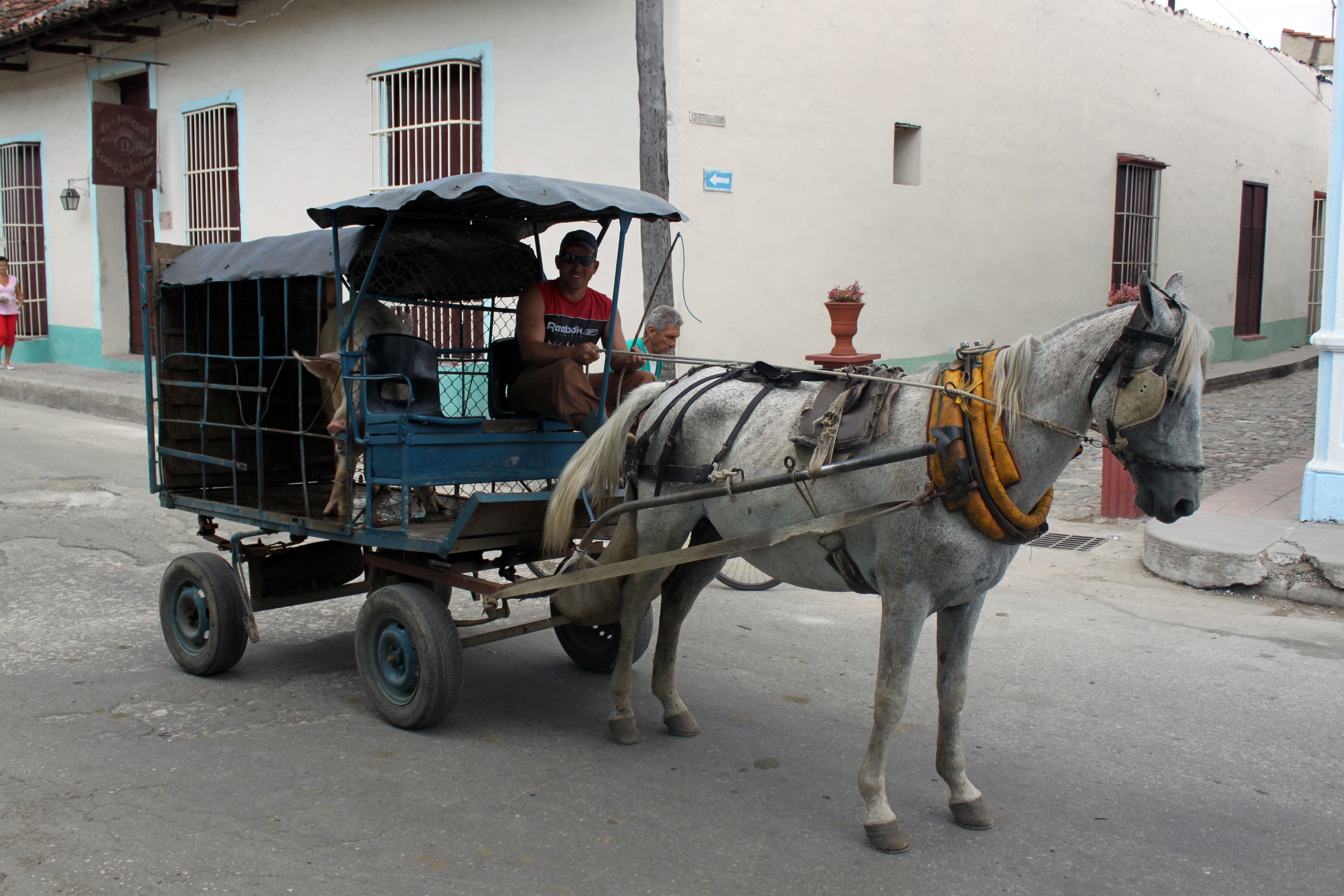
Transporting a pig in a horse-drawn vehicle in Sancti Spiritus, 2012

Since 1990 and the dissolution of the Soviet Union, Cuba has been experiencing special economic conditions, with problems linked to the cost and availability of fuel and spare parts for motor vehicles. While motor vehicles were often used before the 1990s, the "Special Period" (el período especial en tiempos de paz) brought a resurgence in the use of the harnessed horse, not least because of the country's fuel supply difficulties. In the space of a few months, the almost total interruption in supplies led to very limited use of tractors; the austerity measures favored the use of work animals, especially draft oxen, but also horses and mules. The government then embarked on a policy of active support for horse-drawn vehicles and cattle. Draft animals were reintroduced to farms where tractors had long been used.

Number of tractors and working animals in Cuba (source MINAGRI)
	1960	1970	1980	1990	2000
Tractors	7 000	51 600	68 300	70 200	40 000
Horses	800 000	741 000	811 000	235 000	303 000
Draft cattle	500 000	490 000	338 000	338 000	396 000

According to data collected by the Cuban Institute of Agricultural Mechanization (Instituto de Investigaciones de Mecanización Agropecuaria, IIMA by its acronym in Spanish) of the Ministry of Agriculture, the national horse population has been in decline for some time, standing at around 400 000 (2002) or 300 000 head, although trends suggest a resurgence in the use of horses to pull carts and carriages. This trend is particularly palpable on farms. Dr Paul Starkey postulates that the working animal population has reached its peak, and will gradually decline over the next few years.

== Usage ==
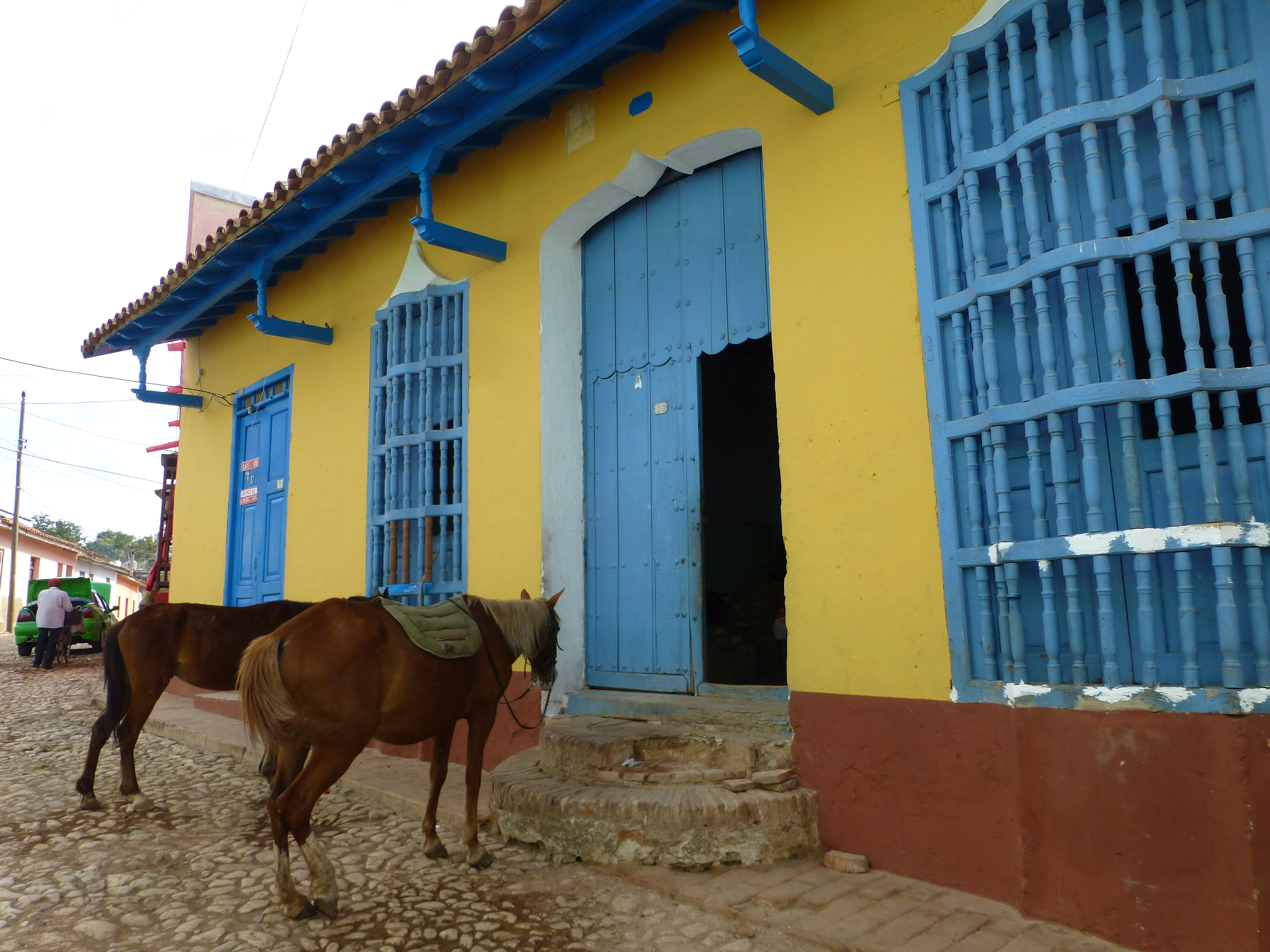
Horses in front of a house in Trinidad

For many years, horseback riding has been the main means of transportation in Cuba. Most of the island's horses (as of 2002) are ridden for work (especially on cattle farms) and harnessed for rural or urban transport, and more rarely ridden for pleasure or equestrian sports.

Local horses have historically been used by the entire population, from the Spanish Civil Guard to pirates. As in other American countries, the gaited horse capable of going amble, the marchador, is particularly popular. A show of rodeo is also practiced.

The agricultural sector is very important to the Cuban economy as it represents around 50% of foreign exchange earnings. Working animals are used on all kinds of farms, and in particular on family farms and production cooperatives, which represents 40% of the country's national food production. In the mountainous regions of the east of the country, some horses are used as packhorses.

Despite the high quality of local horses, these animals have rarely been exported to the United States, for political reasons. Research is underway into the production of biomethane from horse manure.

=== Horse-drawn vehicle ===
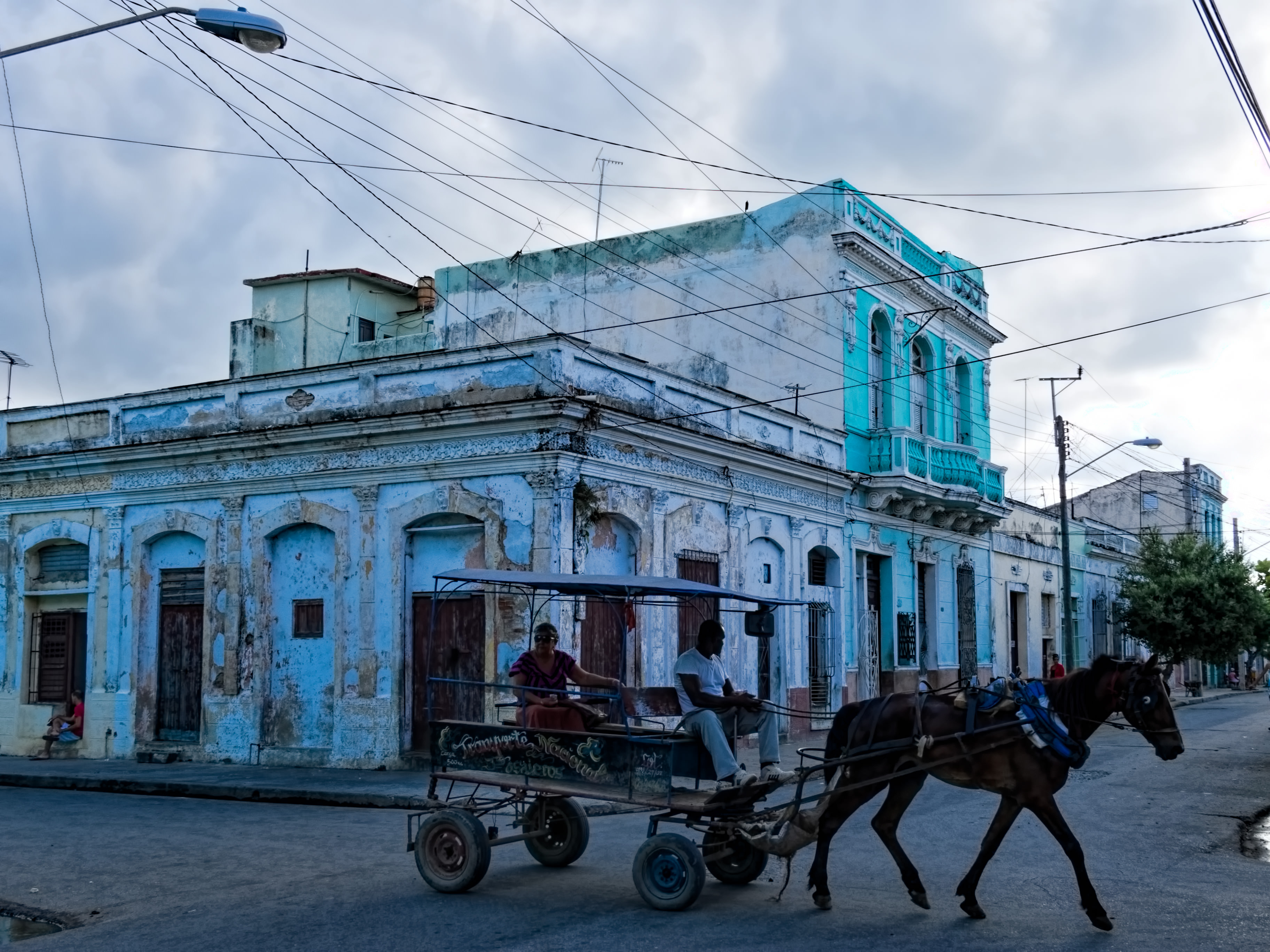
Horse-drawn public transport in Cienfuegos, 2016

Before the advent of motor vehicles, transportation depended on horses and mules, usually with large carts (charrettes), which were used to move both commercial goods and people. Like Nicaragua, the island of Cuba still relies heavily on horse-drawn vehicles. Starkey cites Cuba as a "fascinating example of animal transport in recent times. Cuba illustrates that the decline of animal transport can be reversed if there is the political will and a population ready to re-engage with draft animals". It is also an example of a country where stable horse-drawn practices have been documented. The island still has (in 2011) horse-drawn public transport, with many private operators providing public transport in the major cities using horse-drawn vehicles (coche de caballos). Horse-drawn public transport is still in use in several major Cuban cities in 2011. As a result, the island of Cuba has never totally abandoned horse-drawn transport.

Despite the importance of animal traction in Cuba, some leaders consider horses to be "backward" or "a necessary evil", a view generally different from that of agricultural leaders, for whom animal transport is indispensable to production mechanisms.

The first hitches were generally made almost entirely of wood, and used to transport all kinds of agricultural produce. During the period when Cubans were influenced by European Baroque, it was common to see elegant horse-drawn carriages in the streets of Havana. Modern carriages are two- or four-wheeled, and include calèches and even omnibuses. According to Humberto Valdés (2002), in 2000, 16 000 registered service vehicles were pulled by horses or mules. Traditional horse-drawn carriages with large wooden wheels can still be seen in Bayamo and Granma. In Pinar del Río, horse-drawn omnibuses are equipped with steel wheels fitted with solid rubber tires.

Animal transport also plays an important role in Cuba's rural economy, as well as contributing to urban transport in several provinces. Agricultural horses are often used to complement motorized vehicles.

With a few exceptions, harnessed horses are generally well treated. Occasionally, horses used for urban transport are "in a pitiful state". According to a study of 250 equines used for local passenger transport in the municipality of Sancti Spíritus in 2014, the majority of carriage drivers (68.7%) have been in the business for 5 years or more, and 58.3% of drivers own just one equine, which generally works more than six hours a day.

=== Equestrian tourism ===
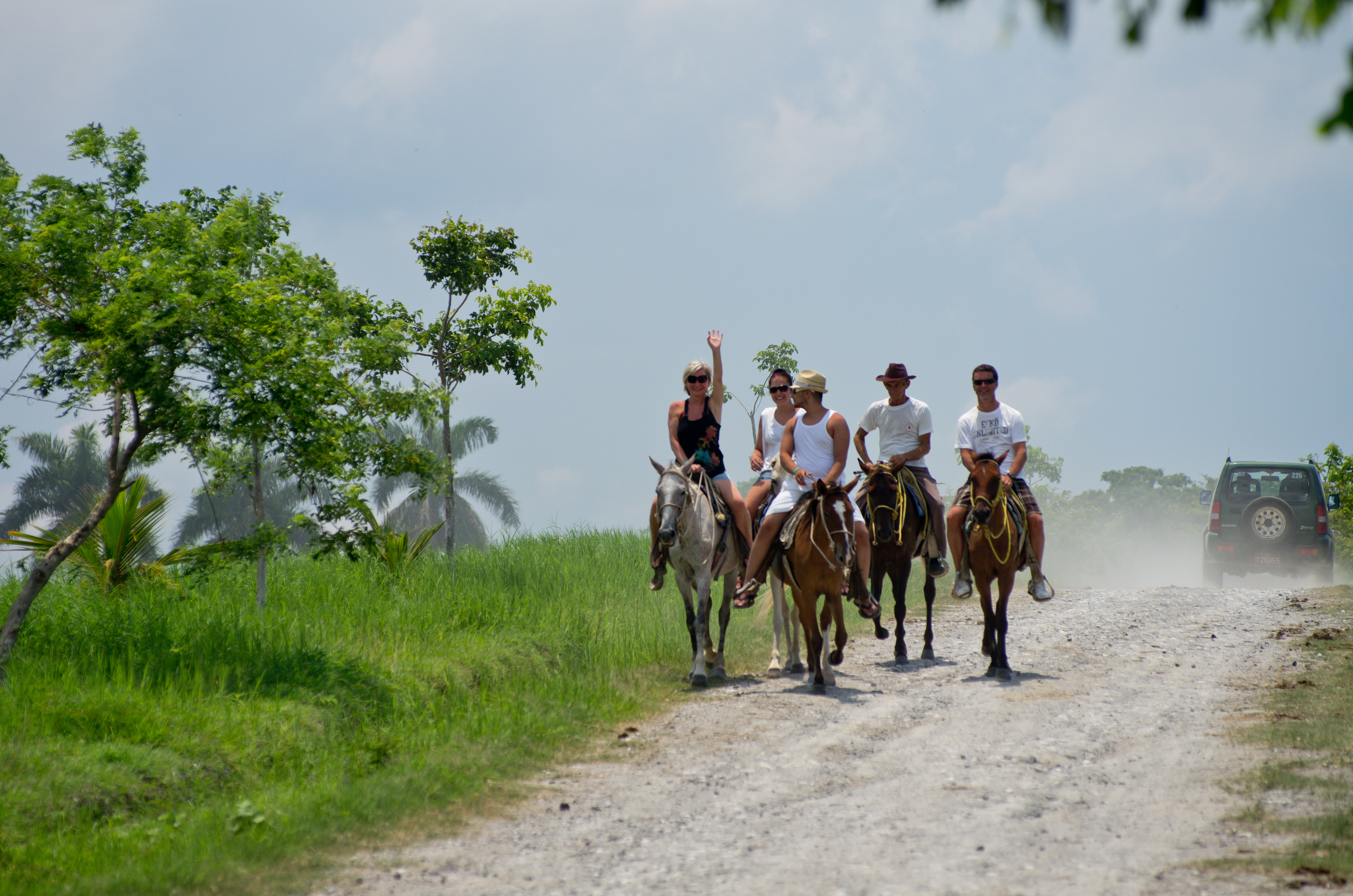
Group of tourists riding horses in Matanzas Province, 2011

Horses are also present in the tourism sector, with the country offering tourists a wide range of opportunities to practice horse riding, both officially and unofficially. Horse rides are suitable for adults and children alike.

== Breeding ==
In 2017, Equine Science estimated Cuba's horse population at 507 600 head, representing 0.86% of the world's horse population. Chris J. Mortensen's book indicates a herd of 773 900 head in 2014. Horses are found just about everywhere on the island, whether mounted or harnessed, as they serve as a regular means of transport.

=== Bred breeds ===
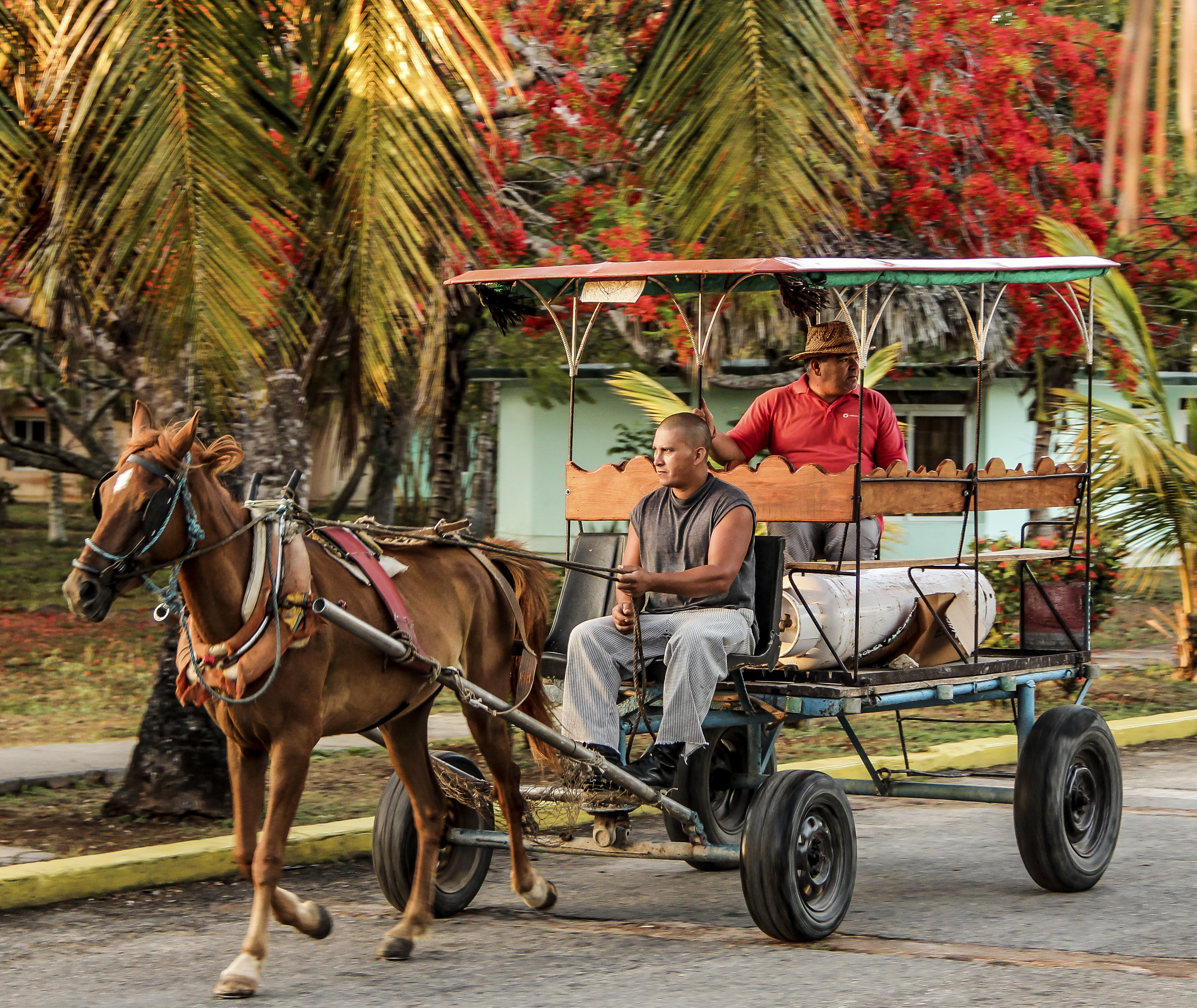
Horse-drawn vehicle in Cuba, 2013

The DAD-IS database lists fourteen breeds of horse in Cuba, including four local breeds: the local breeds are the Cuban Paso (Paso cubano), the Cuban Trotter (Cubano de trote), the Patibarcino and the Cuban Pinto (Pinto cubano); the other breeds bred in Cuba are the Appaloosa, the Belgian Draught, the Spanish Purebred, the Morgan, the Percheron, the Shetland, the Welsh, the Thoroughbred, the Quarter Horse and the Arabian.

Some Paso Fino registered in the USA originate from Cuba.

=== Diseases and parasitism ===
Cuba is affected by the West Nile virus, which causes West Nile fever; epidemiological surveillance was established in 2002, and the first evidence of the existence of this condition was collected in 2003 and 2004.

=== Tick-borne diseases ===
Rickettsia, which causes disease in humans and other animals, are mainly transmitted by ticks; Rickettsia spp. was present in 64% of adult ticks of the species Amblyomma mixtum and 11% of pooled samples of Dermacentor nitens nymphs. In contrast, Rickettsia spp. was not detected in any of the 200 horse blood samples included in this study. It has also been shown that Cuban ticks parasitizing horses can be infected with Coxiella burnetii, which causes Q fever. Dermacentor nitens is the most economically important species of horse parasitic tick.

==== Babesiosis / Equine piroplasmosis ====
Babesiosis (or piroplasmosis) is transmitted locally by Theileria equi or Babesia caballi. It causes serious economic damage to horse breeders and users, particularly as it prohibits the export of animals. It is suggested that the vector agents are endemic to Cuba.

==== Gastrointestinal parasitism ====
Gastrointestinal parasitism is favored by Cuba's tropical climate: 63% of equines studied excrete more than 1,000 eggs of small strongyles per gram of fecal matter, mainly those of Strongylus vulgaris. The first report on anthelmintic resistance in equine cyathostomins in Cuba was published in 2018. Treatment with ivermectin in liquid form has been shown to be effective, particularly on intestinal nematodes. It is suggested that selective anthelmintic treatment (SAT) could be administered to Cuban horses to enable control of their gastrointestinal parasites.

== Culture ==
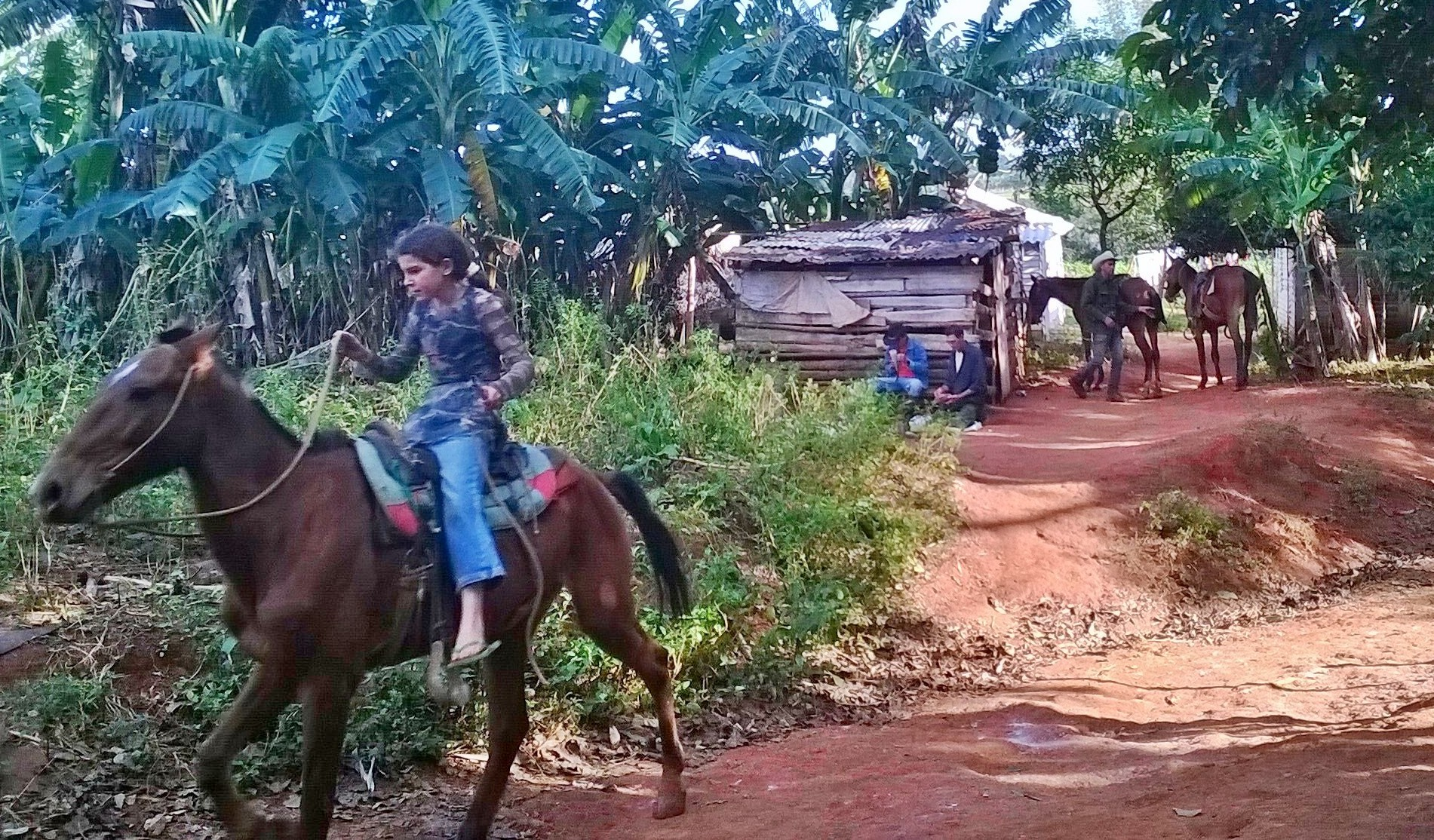
Young girl riding a horse near Viñales

The horse is part of Cuban culture, particularly that of the Vaqueros. It is also represented in Cuban cinema. Critic Michael Chanan cites a scene at the end of the film De Cierta Manera (released in 1977) in which a general sits astride a stallion with enormous testicles: this is a reference to the popular Cuban expression "to have the balls of Maceo's horse", meaning "to be more macho than anyone else". It also features in a number of Cuban folk tales, such as El caballo de Hicotea (The Horse of Hicotea).

The horse is historically present during the santiagueras festivities, which bring together horse races, bonfires, alcohol and satirical songs. The Cuban National Museum exhibits the skeleton of the horse of Máximo Gómez, a hero of the Cuban War of Independence, which historian Rosalie Schwartz considers to be in "questionable taste".

Prostitutes in Cuba are known as jinetera, literally meaning "jockey" or "horsewoman", because they "ride" tourists. These prostitution activities have expanded with the economic crisis.

Buckskin horses are particularly popular with Cubans, who call this coat dorado or mohato.

== See also ==
- Oriental Park Racetrack
- Cuban Paso

== Bibliography ==
- Bennett, Deb (1998). Conquerors: The Roots of New World Horsemanship. Amigo Publications, Inc. ISBN 978-0-9658533-0-9.
- Cabrera, Ángel (2004). Chevaux d'Amérique (in French). Translated by Bellec, Christine. Éditions du Rocher. ISBN 2-268-05129-3.
- Denhardt, Robert (1951). "The Horse in New Spain and the Borderlands". Agricultural History. 25 (4): 145–150. ISSN 0002-1482. JSTOR 3740963.
- Denhardt, Robert (1975). The horse of the Americas. University of Oklahoma Press. ISBN 0-8061-1213-1. OCLC 922660.
- Lonely Planet (2020). Cuba (10th ed.). Edit8. ISBN 978-2-8161-8918-6.
- Ríos, Arcadio; Cárdenas, Jesús (2003). "La tracción animal en Cuba: una perspectiva histórica". La Tracción Animal en Cuba (PDF) (in Spanish). La Habana: Instituto de Investigaciones de Mecanización Agropecuaria. Archived from the original (PDF) on 11 February 2023.
- Salado, José; Cepero, Omelio; Pentón, Miguel; Silveira, Enrique (2006). Caballos de Tracción: Comportamientoe en la ciudad de Sancti Spiritus, Cuba (in Spanish). Vol. 7. Revista Electrónica de Veterinaria REDVET. ISSN 1695-7504.
- Schwartz, Rosalie (1999). Pleasure Island: Tourism and Temptation in Cuba. University of Nebraska Press. ISBN 978-0-8032-9265-9.
- Starkey, Paul; Ríos, Arcadio; Valdés, Humberto; Sotto, Pedro (2002). The importance of horses, mules and donkeys in modern Cuba (PDF). Cuban Institute of Agricultural Mechanisation. Archived from the original (PDF) on 25 March 2023.
- Starkey, Paul (2011). Livestock for traction and transport: world trends, key issues and policy implications. Animal Production and Health Working Paper. Food and Agriculture Organization. doi:10.13140/RG.2.2.29674.34245.
