= Hatuey (beer) =

Cuban ale beer brand

- Type: Beer
- Origin: Cuba
- Website: www.hatuey.com

Hatuey is a beer from Cuba originally produced in the Modelo Brewery of the Bacardi family.

== History ==
Hatuey was first brewed in 1927 in Santiago de Cuba. It was the country's first premium beer. Bacardi's Enrique Schueg had hired a German brewer to elaborate the drink. Hatuey was a respected figure within the Baccardi family, Emilio Bacardi had described the Indian chief as "the first martyr to die for Cuba".

From the 1920s to the 1960, the beer was the most-drunk by the US Marine Corps serving in the Caribbean, and was frequently mentioned in the magazine Leatherneck. During the Second World War, members of the 13th Defense Battalion based in Cuba created the "Chief Hatuey Drinking Club".

Equally attractive to the sailors [and Marines] was the beer… Hatuey… It was a local brew with the profile of an Indian on the label. Referred to as the “one-eyed Indian” it was the preferred beverage of the fleet. It was also well known when drinking it, if the Indian suddenly appeared to have two eyes, it was time to start drinking more and faster!

— Bernard E. Trainor, Leatherneck

Its production grew after the 1948 opening of the Modelo Brewery in Cotorro, Havana. In 1960, Fidel Castro confiscated the Modelo Brewery and the production of Hatuey. The Bacardi family fled the country and abandoned the production of the Hatuey beer.

In 1996, Bacardi revived the Hatuey beer, mainly thanks to the brewmaster Eduardo McCormick who had worked at the Modelo Brewery and had written down everything about the brewery and the recipe after fleeing Cuba in the 1960s. In 1998, Bacardi announced it was turning Hatuey into a specialty beer instead of a Cuban product.

In 2011, Bacardi announced the relaunch of the brand as a microbrew. In 2012, the Bacardi family hired a brewmaster to recreate the Hatuey beer. After relaunching in South Florida exclusively, the brand was launched in New York in 2014. The professional dancer Camille Arroyo became the brand ambassador.

== See also ==
- Modelo Brewery
