= Oriental Park Racetrack =

Thoroughbred horse-racing facility in Cuba

Coordinates: 23.073386°N 82.419766°W

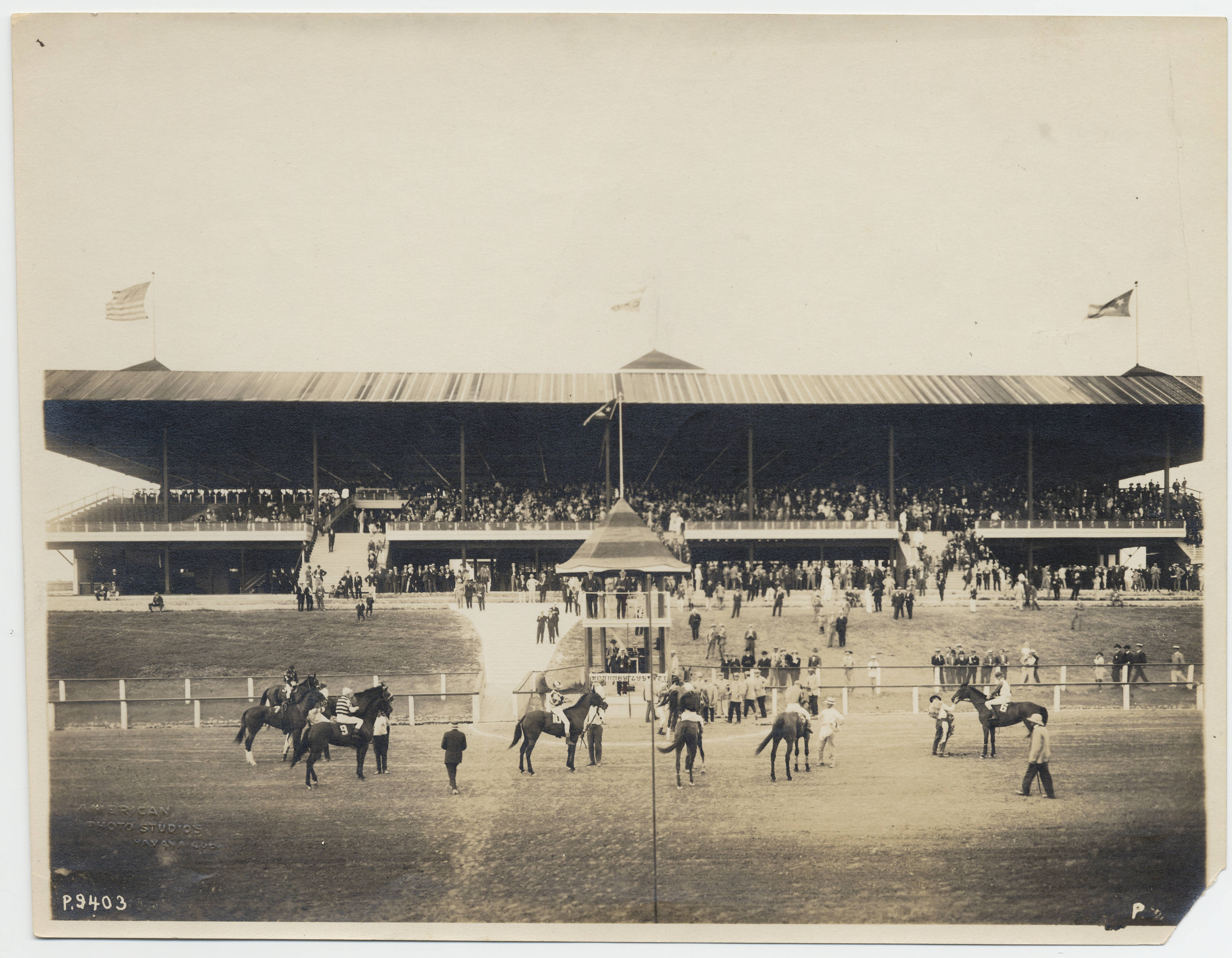
- Interactive map of the Oriental Park Racetrack area

Oriental Park Racetrack in Marianao, Havana, Cuba, was a thoroughbred horse-racing facility operated during the winter by the Havana-American Jockey Club of Cuba. Founded in 1915, Oriental Park was the only race track in Cuba before Fidel Castro came to power in 1959. It was closed 5 February 1967.

== History ==
In its heyday, American owners brought their horses to race at Oriental Park Racetrack during the winter, and future Hall of Fame jockey Laverne Fator rode there in 1918, as did Alfred Robertson in the mid-1920s and Cuban-born Avelino Gomez. With American racetracks closed, jockey Joe Culmone, contract rider for Brookmeade Stable, won three races at Oriental Park on 31 December 1950, tying Bill Shoemaker for most wins that year by an American jockey. Shoemaker won on the same day at Agua Caliente Racetrack in Tijuana, Mexico.

Oriental Park is also famous for hosting the 5 April 1915 boxing match between Jack Johnson and Jess Willard.

Many American celebrities on vacation or who were performing at the nearby Tropicana Club visited fashionable Oriental Park Racetrack, as did Europeans such as tennis star Suzanne Lenglen. Prominent hotelier John McEntee Bowman, owner of Westchester Country Club in Rye, New York and president of Bowman-Biltmore Hotels Corp., which counted the Seville-Biltmore Hotel in Havana as part of its hotel properties, served as president of the Havana-American Jockey Club, as did Harry D. ("Curly") Brown, owner of Arlington Park in Chicago.

In 1937, gangster Meyer Lansky gained control of the racetrack and casino. Albert Anastasia also possessed interests in the track. In 1939, to celebrate the renovation of the racetrack's casino, Cuban dictator Fulgencio Batista was presented with the ceremonial keys to the casino. When Lansky's friend, mafia boss Lucky Luciano, moved to Cuba following his commutation and deportation from the United States, he became a frequent visitor to the track.

At Calder Race Course in Miami Gardens, Florida, is a wall in its Hall of Fame dedicated to the famous Cuban horsemen who raced at Oriental Park.

Oriental Park also hosted automobile races in 1920.

== Thoroughbred races ==
- Cuban Derby
- Cuban Grand National Handicap

== See also ==
- Horses in Cuba
