= Cuban Paso =

Cuban horse breed

Cuban paso
- Country of origin: Cuba
- Use: Saddle and stock horse

Traits
- Height: From 1,40 to 1,52 m

The Cuban Paso (Spanish: Caballo Cubano de Paso) is a horse breed native to Cuba, with an extra gait like all Paso horses.

== History ==
Like many horses on the American continent, the Cuban Paso is descended from Iberian ancestors brought over by the Spanish conquistadores.

== Description ==
The Cuban Paso belongs to the Criollo group of light horses. Average height ranges from 1.40 m to 1.52 m according to CAB International, and from 1.45 m to 1.51 m according to the Delachaux guide.

The conformation is said to be harmonious. The head is small and fine, with a generally straight profile, large eyes, a broad forehead and small ears. The neck is strong, of medium length, and arched. The chest is broad and muscular. The back is moderately long, with short loins. The rump is slightly sloping, broad and well muscled. Limbs are muscular and short, with strong knees. Mane and tail are well furnished.

All coat colors are possible, but bay is the most common.

The breed has additional gaits, in this case the marcha fina y gualdrapeada, also known as marcha or andaruras, a four-beat gait renowned for the comfort it provides in the saddle, and which can be maintained over long distances.

== Usage ==
The Cuban Paso is mainly ridden, especially for trail riding and equestrian tourism, and used for transportation.

== Spread of breeding ==
Bonnie Lou Hendricks (University of Oklahoma) states (2007) that the breed is common, while the Delachaux guide describes it as local and rare, specific to Cuba. The DAD-IS database does not provide a count or indicate any level of threat.

Most Cuban Paso are bred at the La Loma ranch in Cuba's Granma province.

== Bibliography ==
- Horses in Cuba
- Criollo horse
- Cuban Trotter

== Bibliography ==
- Hendricks, Bonnie (2007). International Encyclopedia of Horse Breeds (2nd ed.). University of Oklahoma Press. p. 486. ISBN 978-0-8061-3884-8.
- Méndez, Virgilio (2003). Origen del caballo cubano de paso (PDF) (in Spanish). Asociación Cubana de Producción Animal. p. 26. Archived from the original (PDF) on 2019-11-20.
- Porter, Valerie; Alderson, Lawrence; Hall, Stephen; Sponenberg, Dan Phillip (2016). Mason's World Encyclopedia of Livestock Breeds and Breeding. CAB International. p. 1107. ISBN 978-1-84593-466-8.
- Rousseau, Élise (2014). Tous les chevaux du monde [All the horses in the world] (in French). Delachaux et Niestlé. p. 544. ISBN 978-2-603-01865-1.
