= Cuban Trotter =

Cuban saddle horse breed

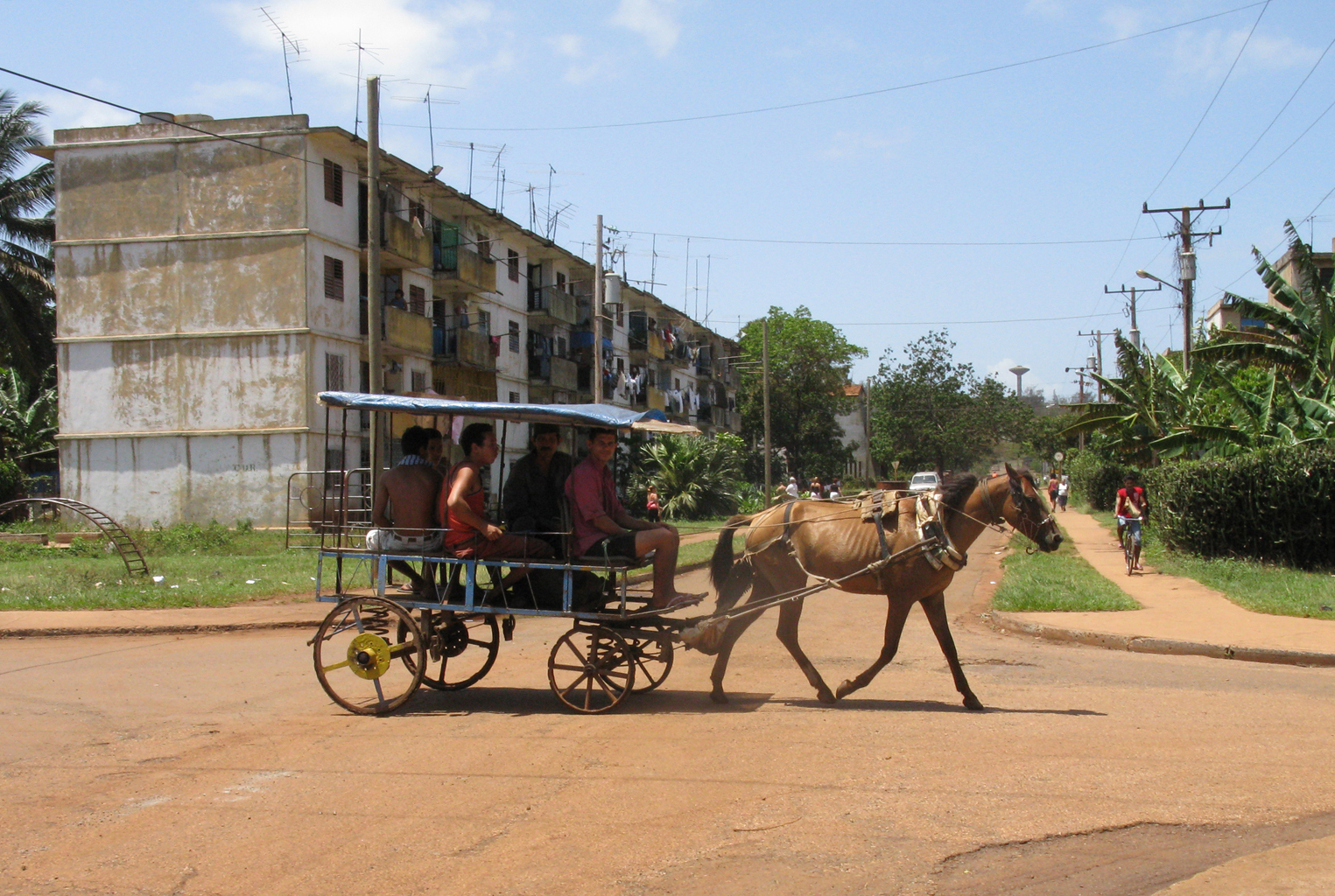
- Cuban trotter in Moa
- Country of origin: Cuba
- Use: Saddle horse

Traits
- Height: From 1,40 to 1,52 m
- Color: Bay or black

The Cuban trotter (Spanish: Cubano de trote / Criollo de trote) is a saddle horse breed native to Cuba. It is renowned for its trotting quality, and is used for driving and working cattle.

== History ==
Contrary to what its name suggests, this is not a racing-type horse, but a criollo type. Like most Latin American horses, it is descended from the Colonial Spanish horse brought by the conquistadores, and is therefore "locally adapted".

The breed is named "Criollo de trote" in the DAD-IS database and "Trotteur criollo" in the Delachaux guide, which also cites the local name Cubano de trote. The breed originates from mixtures of Iberian Criollo horses and Canadian horses, imported before the American Revolution to work on sugarcane plantations.

== Description ==
It shows the Criollo type. The Delachaux guide (2014) cited an average height of 1.48 m to 1.50 m. CAB International (2016) indicated 1.40 m to 1.52 m.

The head has a rectilinear or slightly convex profile, a broad forehead, developed jaws, and is topped by rather short ears. The neck is broad and strong, of medium length. The chest is broad and deep. The back is short and strong. The rump is sloping and the legs are strong. The tail is set low, and generally carried close to the body.

The coat is most often bay or black.

The temperament is vigorous and friendly, and the breed is reputed to be particularly hardy.

== Usage ==
Mostly used as a trotting horse in Cuba, but can also be ridden, especially for cattle and farm work.

== Spread of breeding ==
No population data is listed for it in DAD-IS.

== See also ==
- Horses in Cuba
- Cuban Paso

== Bibliography ==
- Hendricks, Bonnie (2007). International Encyclopedia of Horse Breeds (2nd ed.). Norman: University of Oklahoma Press. ISBN 978-0-8061-3884-8.
- Porter, Valerie; Alderson, Lawrence; Hall, Stephen; Sponenberg, Dan (2016). Mason's World Encyclopedia of Livestock Breeds and Breeding (6th ed.). CAB International. ISBN 978-1-84593-466-8.
- Rousseau, Élise (2014). Tous les chevaux du monde [All the horses in the world] (in French). Delachaux et Niestlé. ISBN 978-2-603-01865-1.
