= Modelo Brewery =

Cuban brewery

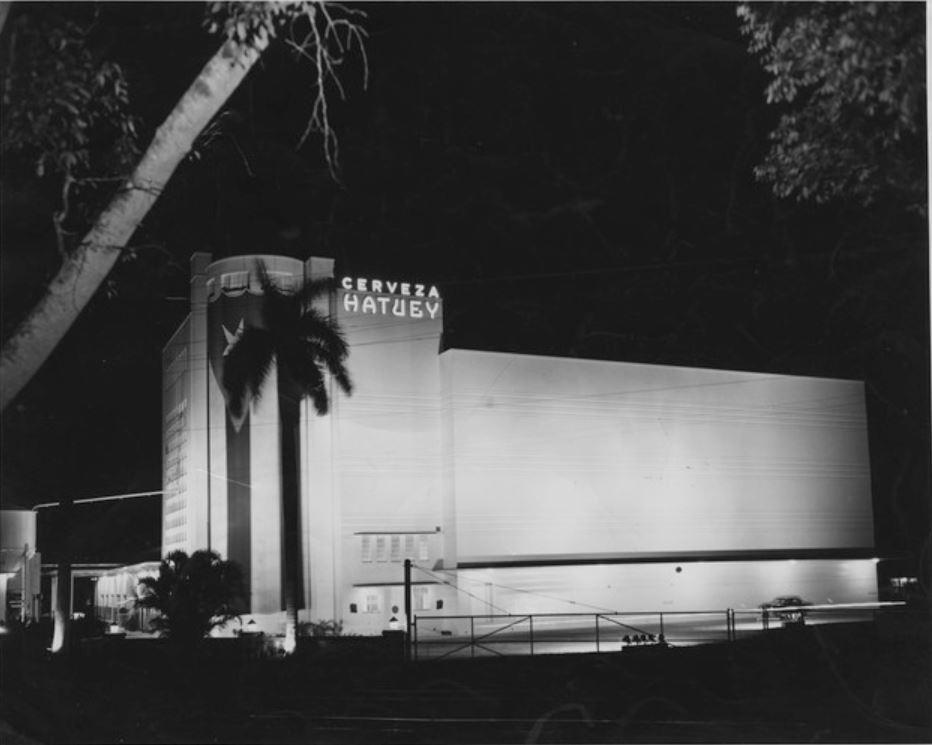
- Interactive map of the Modelo Brewery area

General information
- Type: Industrial
- Coordinates: 23.026111°N 82.2475°W

Modelo Brewery, designed by the Cuban architect Enrique Luis Varela, was built in 1948 for Compañia Ron Bacardi S.A. Its address is the corner of 52 and Carretera Central, Cotorro, Havana, Cuba. In 1952, Ernest Hemingway featured Hatuey beer in his book The Old Man and the Sea. When he was awarded the Nobel Prize for Literature, the company threw him a party at the Modelo Brewery. Hemingway was a frequent patron of the brewery since it was located near to his home in Havana at Finca Vigía.

== History ==
The brewery was built in 1946 to meet the increasing domestic demand for the Hatuey beer. The brewery produced 3.5 million liters of beer on its first 19 months of operations.

== Architecture ==
This building has a modern aesthetic and proportions typical of Varela's works (Revolution Square in Havana), The corner is a cylinder hinge between two facades. One side is dotted with small windows, the other almost blank and marked by horizontal bands reminiscent of the Streamline Moderne architecture style.

The building was to service Cuba's growing demand for Hatuey beer. This brewery was constructed ten miles from Havana in a site named El Cotorro in 1948. Being true to its name, it was a state-of-the-art facility, a model brewery. In Modelo's first nineteen months of production, 3.5 million liters of beer were produced. and in 1959, 10 million cases were produced and Hatuey Beer controlled 50% of Cuba's beer market.

== Confiscation ==
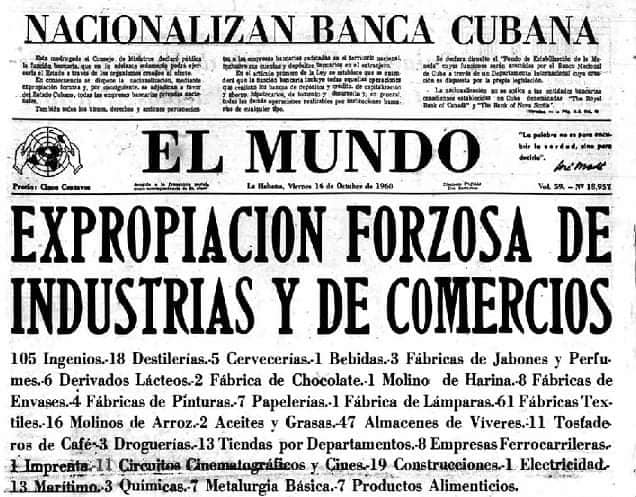
El Mundo Newspaper_Expropiacion Forzosa de Industrias_16 October 1960

On 14 October 1960, after 34 years of uninterrupted growth, Compañía Ron Bacardi S.A.’s Cuban assets, including the three Hatuey Breweries, were confiscated by the revolutionary government, and Hatuey lost its market. During this period, sales of Hatuey Beer were 12,000,000 cases per year. Beginning in 2011, the Bacardi family again began making beers in the United States to market under the Hatuey label.

== See also ==
- Streamline Moderne
