= Hatuey =

Hispaniolan Cacique (died 1512)

Hatuey of Guahabá
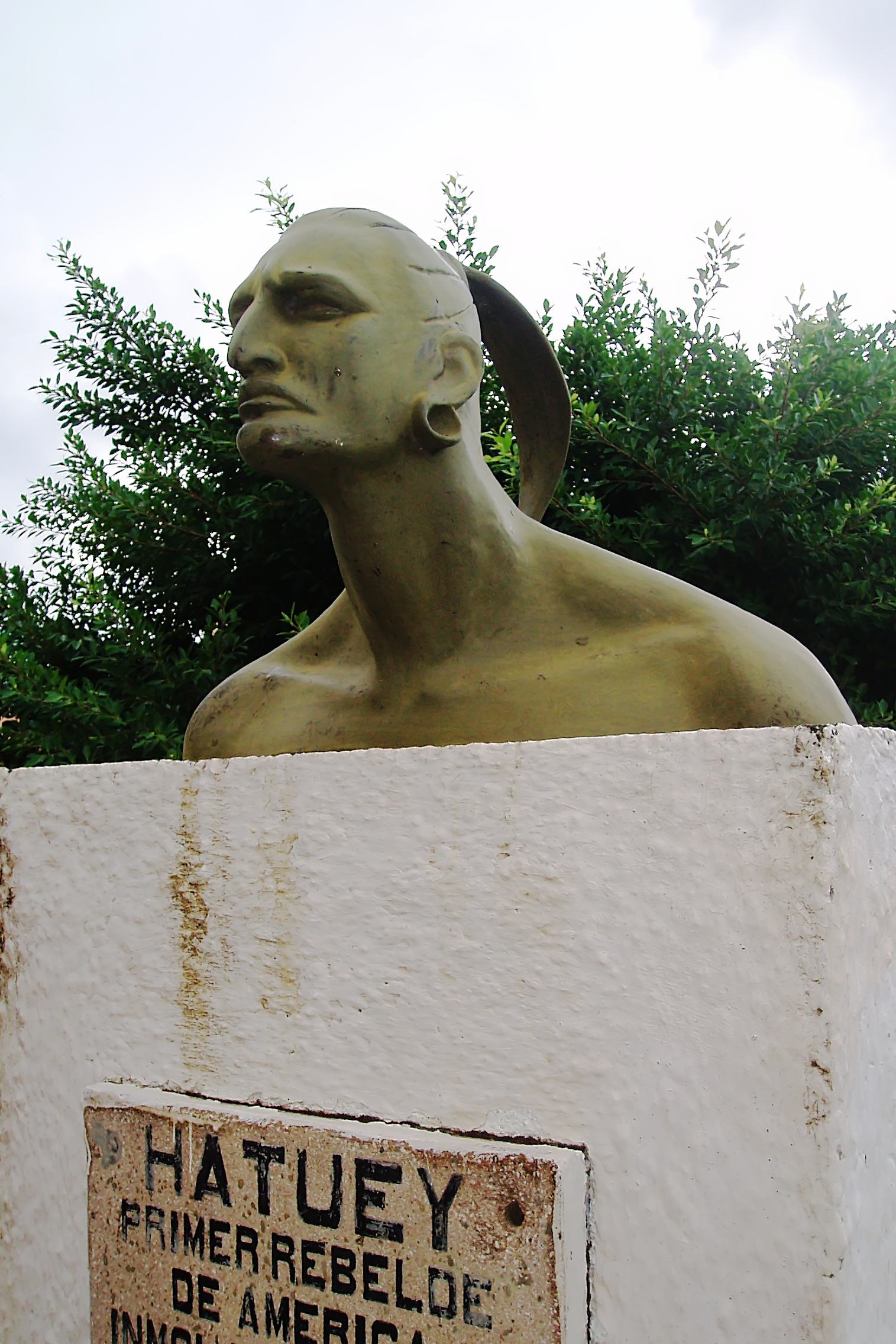
- The monument of Hatuey, in Baracoa city, Cuba—the place he besieged the most while fighting the Spanish forces.

Cacique of Guahabá
- Born: c. 1478-1479; Hispaniola
- Died: February 2, 1512; Baracoa, Cuba
- Known for: Being Cuba's "first national hero"

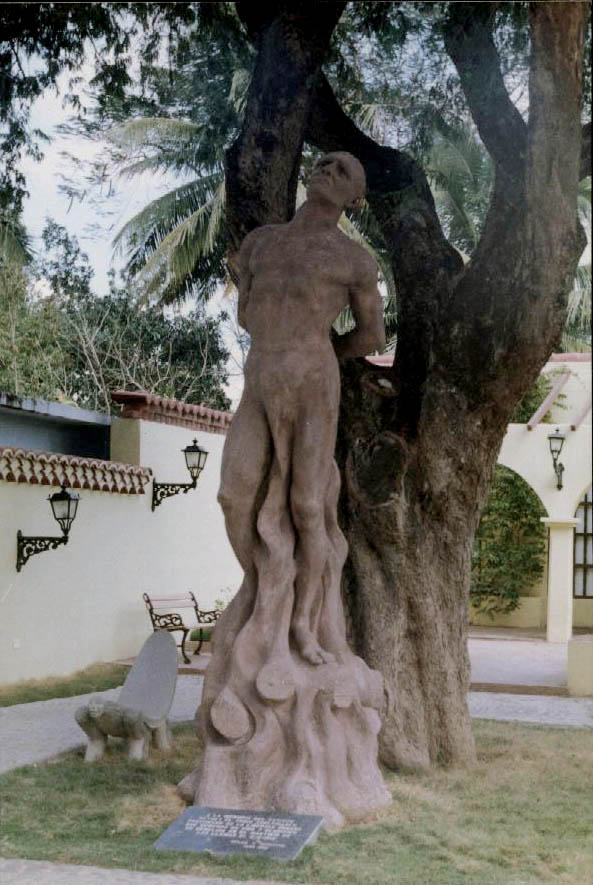
Monument of Cacique Hatuey in Yara city, depicting the moment he was burnt by Spanish soldiers, bound to a tamarind tree planted in 1907.

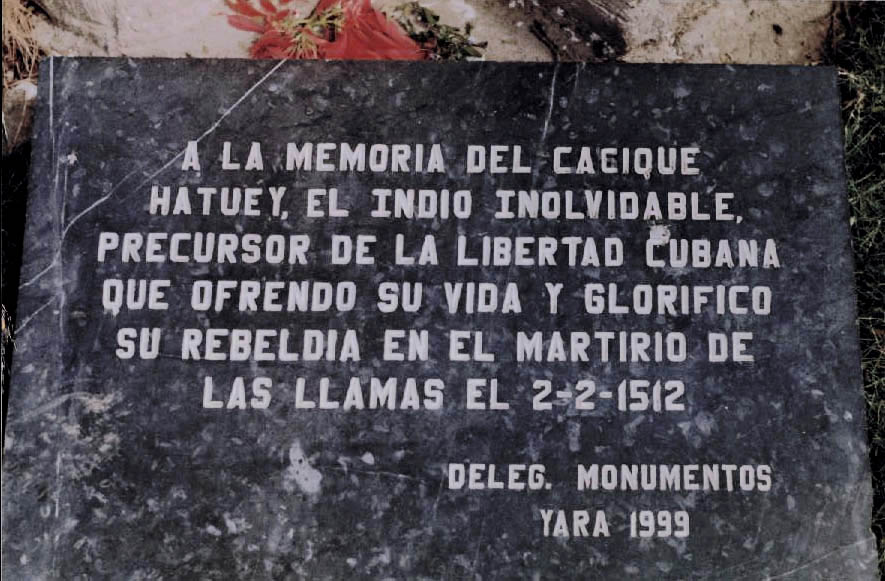
Plate at the base of the monument. It reads "To the memory of Chief Hatuey, the unforgettable Indian, precursor of Cuban liberty who offered his life and glorified his rebellion in martyrdom by flames on February 2, 1512. Monuments Delegation of Yara, 1999".

Hatuey (/ɑːˈtweɪ/), also Hatüey (/ˌɑːtuˈeɪ/; died February 2, 1512), was an Indigenous cacique (Taíno chief) of the Hispaniolan cacicazgo of Guanaba (in present-day La Gonave, Haiti). He lived from the late 15th until the early 16th century. He and many of his tribesmen travelled from present-day La Gonave by canoe to Cuba to warn the Indigenous people in Cuba about the Spaniards that were arriving to conquer the island.

Hatuey later attained legendary status for leading a group of Indigenous people in a fight against the invasion of the Spaniards, thus becoming one of the first fighters against Spanish colonialism in the New World. He is celebrated as "Cuba's first national hero".

== Life and death ==
In 1511, Diego Velázquez set out from Hispaniola to what is now known as present-day Guantánamo Province in easternmost Cuba to conquer and subjugate the local Indigenous population, who had previously been recorded there by Christopher Columbus. Velázquez was preceded, however, by Hatuey, who fled Hispaniola with a party of four hundred in canoes and warned some of the Indigenous people of eastern Cuba about what to expect from the Spaniards.

Bartolomé de Las Casas later attributed the following speech to Hatuey which was addressed against Christianity. He showed the Taíno of Caobana a basket of gold and jewels, saying:

They have a God whom they worship and adore, and it is in order to get that God from us so that they can worship Him that they conquer us and kill us ... Here is the God of the Christians. If you agree, we will do areitos (which is their word for certain kinds of traditional dance) in honour of this God and it may be that we shall please Him and He will order the Christians to leave us unharmed.

The Taíno chiefs in Cuba did not respond to Hatuey's message, and few joined him to fight. Hatuey resorted to guerrilla tactics against the Spaniards, and was able to confine them for a time. He and his fighters were able to kill at least eight Spanish soldiers. Eventually, using mastiff dogs and torturing the Indigenous for information, the Spaniards succeeded in capturing him. On 2 February 1512, he was tied to a stake and burned alive at Yara, near the present-day city of Bayamo.

Before he was burned, a priest asked Hatuey if he would accept Jesus and go to heaven. Las Casas recalled the reaction of the chief:

[Hatuey], thinking a little, asked the religious man if Spaniards went to heaven. The religious man answered yes... The chief then said without further thought that he did not want to go there but to hell so as not to be where they were and where he would not see such cruel people. This is the name and honour that God and our faith have earned.

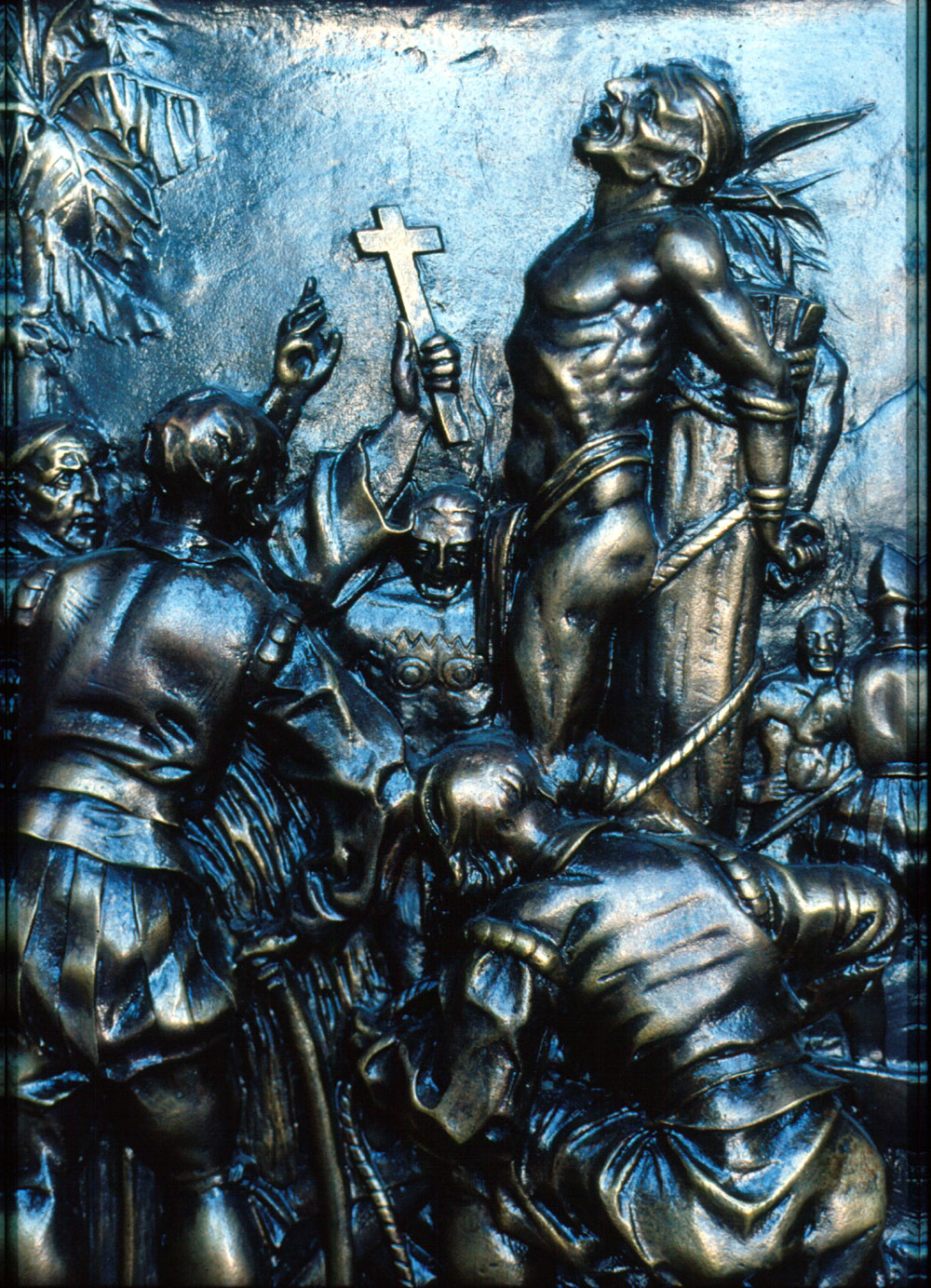
Burning of Hatuey. From a bas-relief of the portal of El Capitolio of Havana.

== Legacy ==
Hatuey is considered "Cuba's first national hero" and one of the earliest fighters against Spanish colonialism. The town of Hatuey, located south of Sibanicú in the Camagüey Province of Cuba, was named after him.

Hatuey also lives on as a beer brand name. Beer has been brewed in Santiago de Cuba and sold under the Hatuey brand name since 1927, initially by the native Cuban company, Compañia Ron Bacardi S.A. After nationalization of industry in 1960, brewing was taken over by Empresa Cerveceria Hatuey Santiago. Beginning in 2011, the Bacardi family again began making beers in the United States to market under the Hatuey label. Hatuey is also a brand of a type of sugary, non-alcoholic malt beverage called malta. Hatuey is also a Dominican brand of soda cracker.

The logo of the Cuban cigar and cigarette brand Cohiba is a picture of Hatuey.

In a 2010 film shot in Bolivia, Even the Rain, Hatuey is a main character in the film-within-the-film. The film includes a cinematic account of Hatuey's execution.

=== Fine arts ===
The imagery of Hatuey has been appropriated and/or incorporated into diverse artistic genres, most notably into the Afro-Cuban Yiddish opera, Hatuey: Memory of Fire. In the visual arts, multiple artists have used the Taíno chief's image, most notably Cuban-American artist Ric Garcia and U.S. Marine Corps artist Donald Dickson, among others.

== See also ==
- List of Taínos
- Taíno people
- Radbod of Frisia, who claimed a similar preference to "be in hell [rather] than to go to heaven"
