= Romeo y Julieta (cigarette) =

Brand of Cuban cigarettes

- Cuban pack of Romeo y Julieta; Habana cigarettes
- Product type: Cigarette
- Current owner: Altadis, a subsidiary of Imperial Tobacco
- Produced by: Altadis, a subsidiary of Imperial Tobacco
- Country: Cuba
- Introduced: 1999; 27 years ago
- Markets: Cuba, Spain, Germany, Austria, Switzerland, Moldova, Russia

Romeo y Julieta cigarettes is a Cuban brand of cigarettes, currently owned by the Franco-Spanish company Altadis, a subsidiary of Imperial Tobacco and manufactured by Habanos SA and BrasCuba. The brand is named after the tragic love story of Romeo and Juliet.

== History ==
Romeo y Julieta, originally famous for its premium Cuban cigars, expanded production to include cigarettes in 1999. Manufactured by Habanos S.A. and BrasCuba, the brand is owned by Altadis, a subsidiary of Imperial Tobacco. What makes these cigarettes distinctive is that they are made from the same high-quality dark tobacco as Romeo y Julieta cigars, giving them a very rich and strong flavor, similar to other robust brands like Gauloises. Romeo y Julieta cigarettes are mainly sold in Cuba, but are or were sold in Spain, Germany, Austria, Switzerland, Mexico Moldova and Russia. Made of the same tobacco as their older cigar namesakes, Romeo y Julieta cigarettes are notable for their very strong flavour. They are made of dark tobacco, like gauloises.

== See also ==
- Tobacco smoking
- Cohiba cigarettes
