= Cohiba (cigarette) =

Cuban brand of cigarettes

- Product type: Cigarette
- Current owner: Imperial Brands
- Produced by: Altadis; Brascuba
- Country: Cuba
- Introduced: 1987; 39 years ago
- Related brands: Romeo y Julieta
- Markets: Spain, Latin America
- Website: brascuba.com/cohiba

Cohiba (an Indigenous Cuban word for "tobacco") is a Cuban brand of cigarettes created by Habanos S.A. They are currently manufactured by the French-Spanish company Altadis, a subsidiary of Imperial Brands. Since 2003, "Brascuba Cigarrillos" has produced the brand in Latin America, the Caribbean, and Russia.

== History ==
Production of Cohiba cigarettes began in 1987 in Cuba as a joint venture between Habanos S.A. and Cita Tobaccos de Canarias, S.L. They are made entirely of a blend of Cuban black leaf tobacco from the Vuelta Abajo region, and the tobacco is 100% additive free. Cohiba cigarettes are called cigarillos negros (black cigarettes) and known for their very strong flavor.

The brand is mainly sold in Cuba, and is distributed in many countries such as Spain and Austria.

== Packaging ==
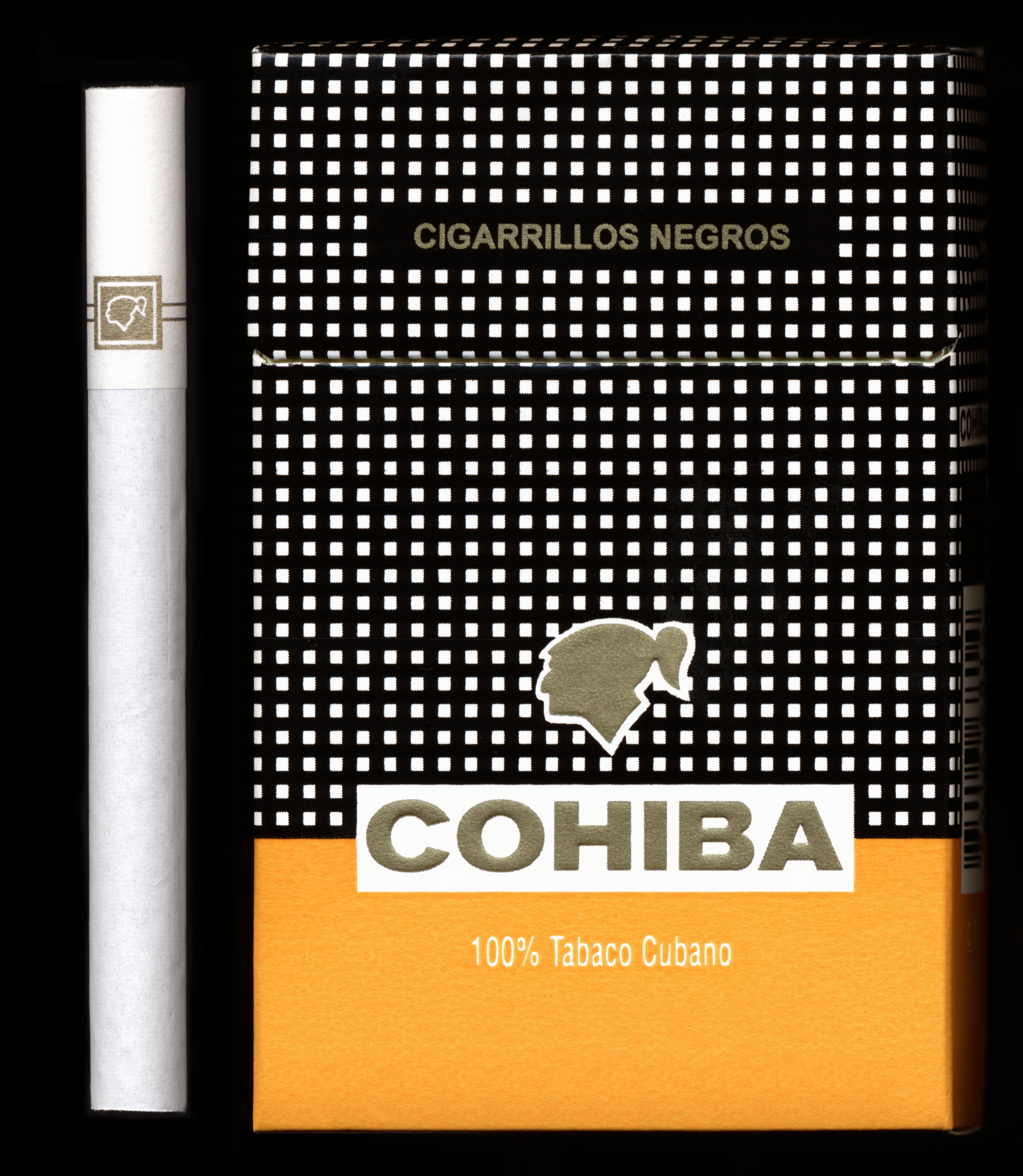
A pack of Cohiba, with a cigarette on the left side

The pack consists out of a black-white Checkerboard pattern, bordered at the bottom by a large yellow-orange stripe. At the top, the word "Original" is written. Slightly underneath is the image of a man's profile, the primary identifier of the Cohiba brand, with the name "Cohiba" written underneath. At the bottom, the phrase "Cigarillos Cubanos" is written.

As with the cigars of the same name, the packaging is divided into two parts: a black and white checkered pattern and a plain orange, each with the lettering COHIBA and CIGARILLOS NEGROS in gold. The word "Cohiba" comes from the language of the Taino Indians and signifies a wrap made of tobacco leaves. Cohiba's logo is the head of the Taino chief Hatuey, who is considered Cuba's first revolutionary. In the recent history of Cuba under Castro, when the Cohiba brand was born, Hatuey was a welcome motif. The cigarettes themselves are white throughout and have two surrounding lines to visually distinguish the filter, as well as Hatuey's head, both again in gold.

The design of the packaging was slightly changed in 2006: size of the black and white pattern, font size, gold line around the lettering COHIBA and between the orange and black and white area. The design of the cigarette and its imprint has been retained. The current design also shows minimum changes: the surrounding golden line between the orange and the black and white area has been removed. The lettering Cigarillos Negros has been reduced in size so that it roughly corresponds to the height of the white squares. Approx. 70% of the back is legally printed with a black and white warning notice.

== See also ==
- Cohiba (cigar brand)
- Tobacco smoking
- Romeo y Julieta
