= Karl Hagenauer =

Austrian designer

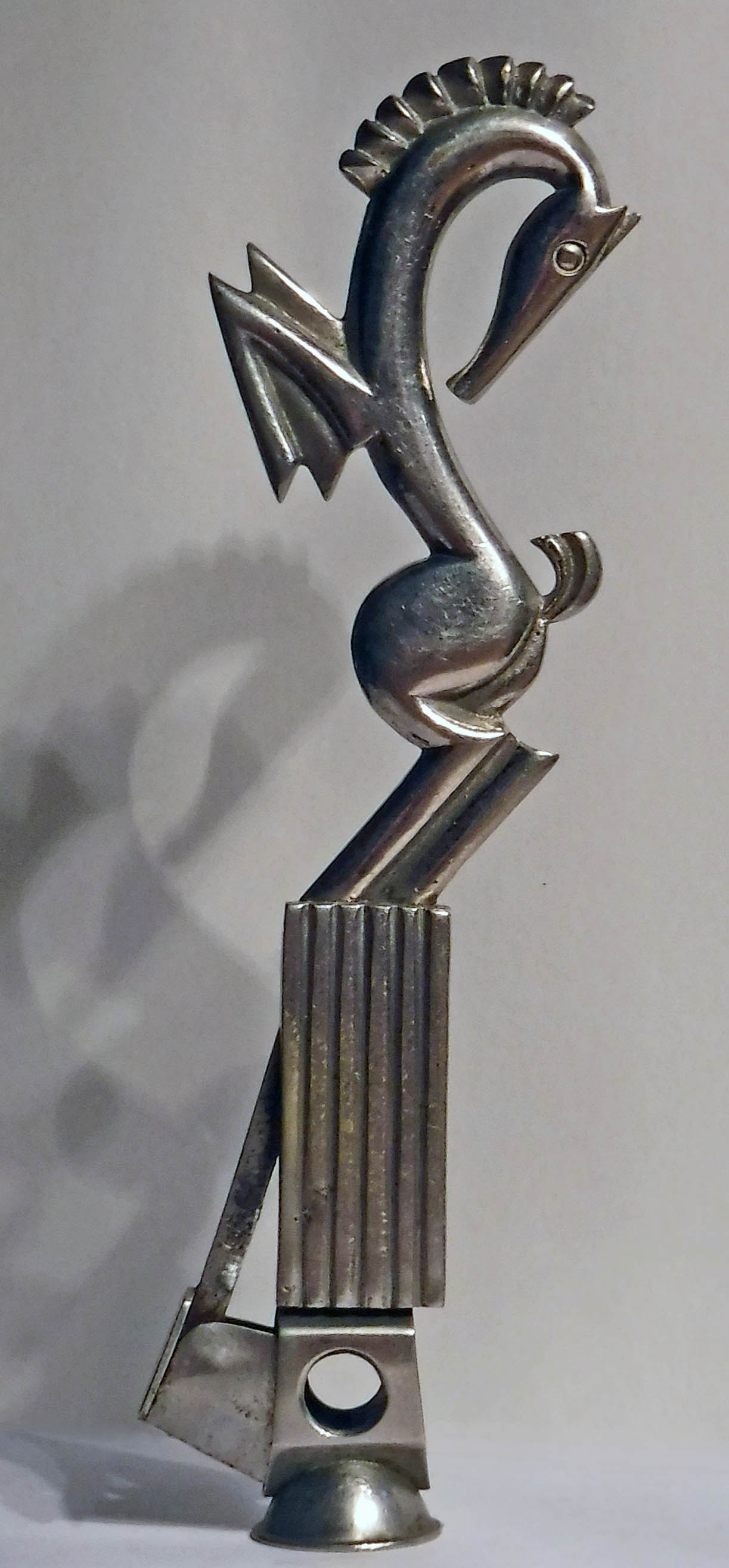
Cigar cutter from the Werkstätte Hagenauer Wien

Karl Hagenauer (1898–1956) was an influential Austrian designer in the Art Deco style.

Goldsmith. Carl Hagenauer founded what became the Werkstätte Hagenauer Wien in 1898. His oldest son, Karl, who would eventually assume leadership of the family business, enrolled at the Vienna School of Applied Arts at age eleven. There he studied with Josef Hoffmann and Oskar Strnad and created designs for the Wiener Werkstätte art collective. After wartime service in the infantry, he resumed his training and qualified as an architect. He joined the family business in 1919.

Hagenauer was responsive to the change in public taste influenced by the popularity of the Vienna Secession. His stylized animals and whimsical creatures handcrafted in brass had broad appeal in domestic and American markets. Some were useful, such as mirrors, cigar cutters, ashtrays, candlesticks, bookends, hood ornaments and lamp bases. Other larger sculptures in wood and metal (such as the iconic Josephine Baker in the collection of the Casa Lis Art Nouveau and Art Deco Museum in Salamanca) were purely decorative.

Hagenauer's work was presented at the 1925 Paris Exposition, where he won a bronze and a silver medal.

He designed the company's trademark “wHw” (for Werkstätte Hagenauer Wien) and registered it in 1927. The first catalogue to use the trademark dates to 1928, the year his father died and Hagenauer assumed leadership of the business. While Hagenauer was the principal designer of everyday objects (and some sculptures), his younger brother Franz specialized in sculpture. The company later also produced furniture, chiefly designed by Julius Jirasek.

Hagenauer's work found an avid American market partly through the efforts of New York gallery owner Rena Rosenthal, who featured the Josephine Baker sculpture in a 1935 window display. Rosenthal's patronage was critical to the post-war success of the Werkstätte Hagenauer; the hostilities caused a delay of several years in her payment for a last container of products shipped in 1938 and the subsequent change in exchange rate was very advantageous to the Austrian craftsman, supporting rebuilding efforts.

== Awards ==
- 1923 Prima Mostra Biennale Internazionale delle Arti Decorative, Monza (Diploma)
- 1925 Exposition Internationale des Arts Décoratifs et Industriels Modernes, Paris (Silver and Bronze medal)
- 1927 World's Fair, Philadelphia (Gold medal)
- 1929 International Exhibition, Barcelona
- 1930 Triennale, Monza (with brother Franz Hagenauer)
- 1934 Austrian State Prize
- 1937 World Fair, Paris (Grand Prix)
- 1951 Triennale, Milan (two Gold medals and a Silver medal)

== Literature ==
- Kronsteiner, Olga (2011). Hagenauer, Wiener Moderne und neue sachlichkeit. Vienna: Wagner:Werk Museum. ISBN 978-3-200022614.
- Robinson, Sal and Wayne Meadows (2015). Austrian Figural Corkscrew Design: Auböck ∙ Bosse ∙ Hagenauer ∙ Rohac. Vancouver: Kitsilano Cellars. ISBN 978-0-9689294-1-4.
