= WHW =

WHW may refer to:

- Werkstätte Hagenauer Wien (wHw), a family business in Vienna
- While Heaven Wept (often abbreviated as WHW), a doom metal band
- Das Winterhilfswerk des Deutschen Volkes, commonly known as Winterhilfswerk or WHW, a Nazi social welfare effort
