= Parzinger =

Parzinger is a surname of German origin. Notable people with the surname include:

- Hermann Parzinger (born 1959), German ancient historian
- Tommi Parzinger (1903–1981), German furniture designer and painter
