= Benjamin Goodwin Seielstad =

American painter

- Born: December 23, 1886; Lake Wilson, Minnesota, US
- Died: July 1, 1960 (aged 73); Inglewood, California, US
- Occupations: Newspaper and magazine illustrator

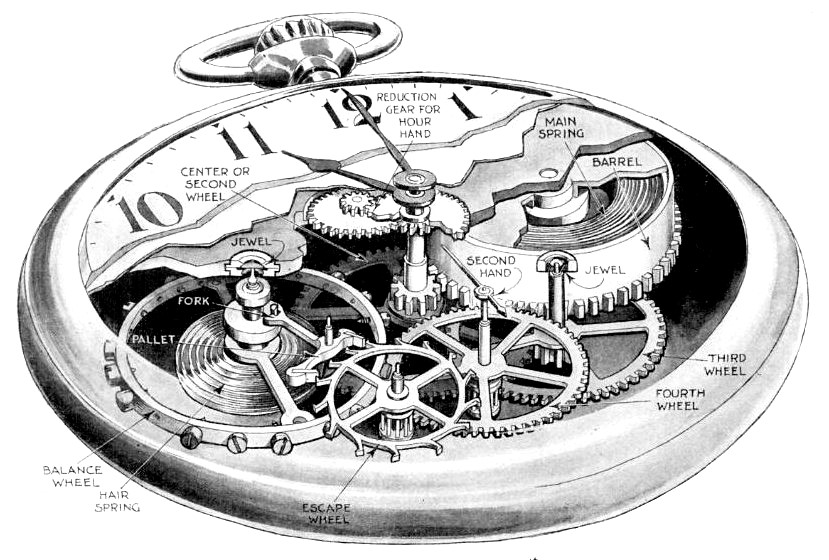
Pocket watch cutaway drawing by B. G. Seielstad, Popular Science Monthly, December 1931.

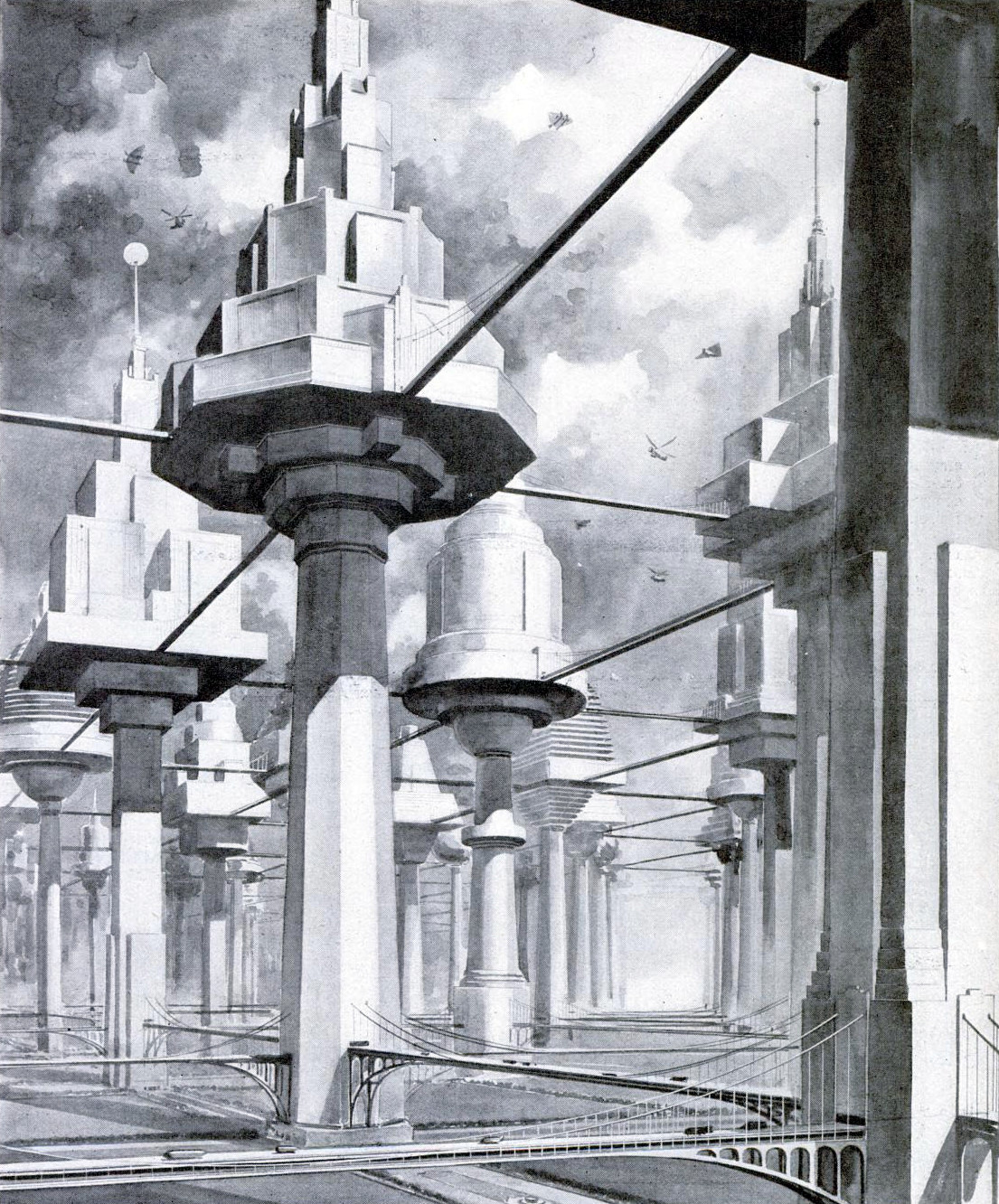
A future city by B. G. Seielstad, Popular Science Monthly, April 1934

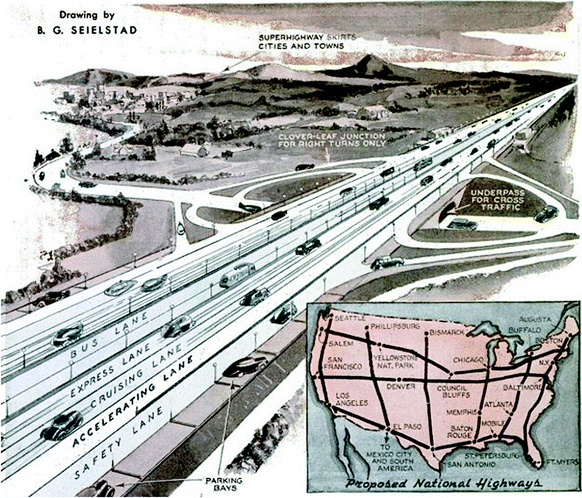
Highway of the future illustration by B. G. Seielstad, Popular Science Monthly, May 1938

Benjamin Goodwin Seielstad, who worked as B. G. Seielstad, (December 23, 1886 – July 1, 1960) was an American painter and illustrator. He claimed his first job was covering the 1906 San Francisco earthquake. He worked for a variety of newspapers and for Popular Science Monthly in the 1930s before working at Life magazine in the 1940s. He was accorded a great deal of latitude in illustrating articles for Popular Science Monthly on topics such as an automated freeway, a futuristic city, and "How The World Will End".

== Early life and family ==
Benjamin Seielstad was born in Lake Wilson, Minnesota, on December 23, 1886, to Gudbrund Julius Seielstad, a farmer, and his wife Carrie Goodwin Benson. Both had migrated to the United States from Norway. Seielstad married Nathalie Pomeroy around 1912; the couple had a daughter, Lucile, born in Los Angeles in 1914.

He studied at the Art Students League of New York where one of his contemporaries was Jean Mannheim.

== Career ==
Seielstad claimed his first job was covering the San Francisco Earthquake (1906). He worked as an illustrator for the Los Angeles Examiner and the Los Angeles Times, as well as for the New York Daily News, New York World and the Philadelphia Examiner.

In the 1930s he illustrated numerous articles in Popular Science Monthly for which he produced drawings showing the technical aspects of products such as a cutaway of a pocket watch (1931), as well as others showing forecast and speculative scientific developments such as a future city (1934) based on the ideas of British writer R. H. Wilenski which envisaged cities composed of buildings on slender trunks like trees. The degree of license given to Seielstad in interpreting the article text was reflected in Popular Science's comment "our artist presents here his conception of this startling proposal".

He also drew an automatic freeway (1938) and produced four illustrations for an article titled "How The World Will End" (1939), one of which showed a "giant meteor" (Note: A meteor has been defined as "the light phenomenon produced by the passage of an object through an atmosphere that heats the surrounding gas to incandescence". As a light phenomenon, a meteor cannot collide with anything; rather, it is the moving object causing the light phenomenon, such as a meteoroid or asteroid, that may be involved in a collision. An object such as that depicted in Seielstad's image, capable of precipitating "the end of the world", would be an asteroid of substantial size.) about to hit New York City and the city's inhabitants fleeing for their lives:

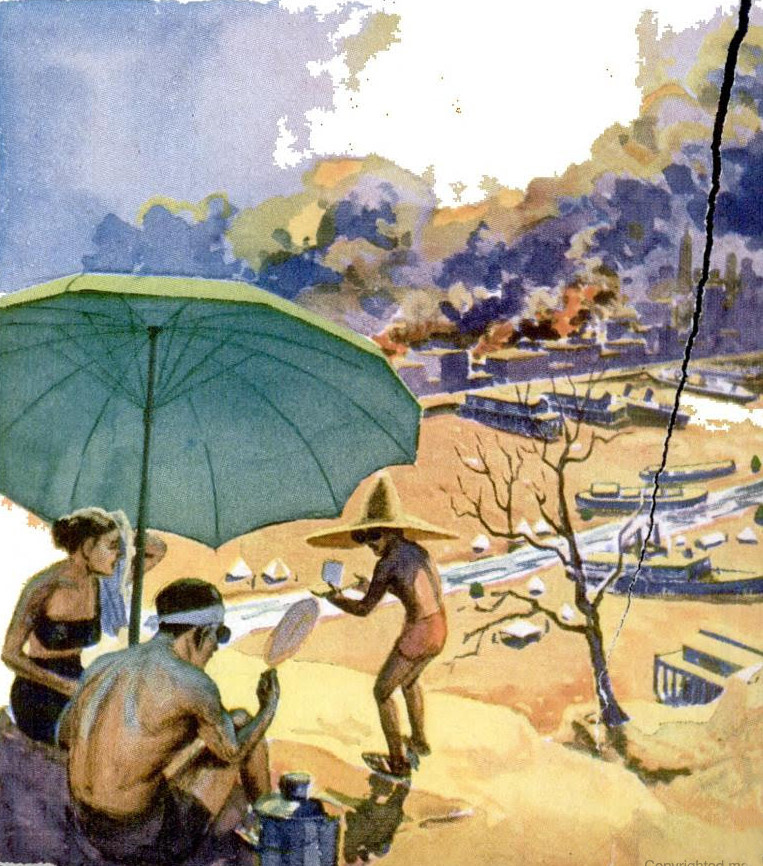
A hotter Sun

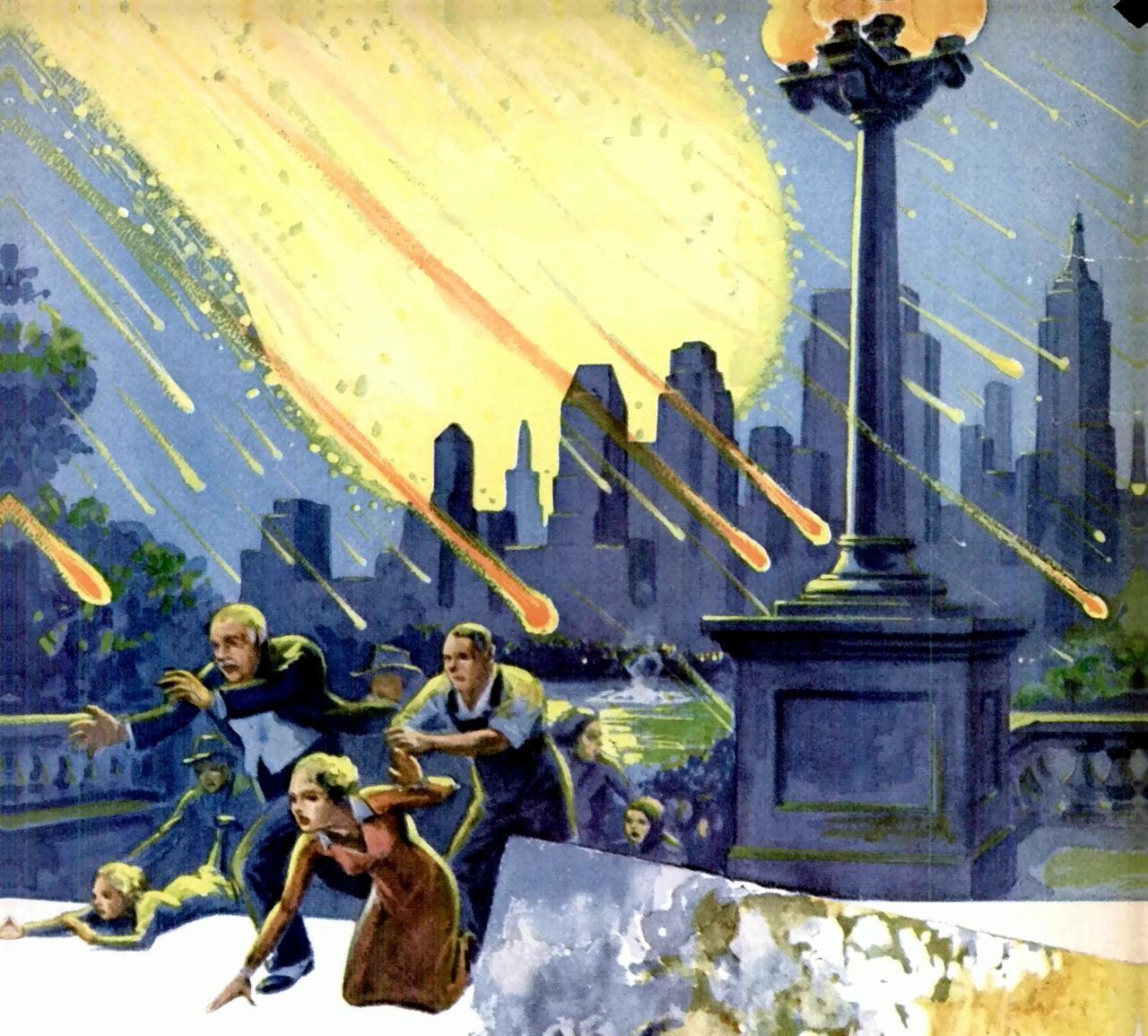
"Giant meteor" collision with the Earth

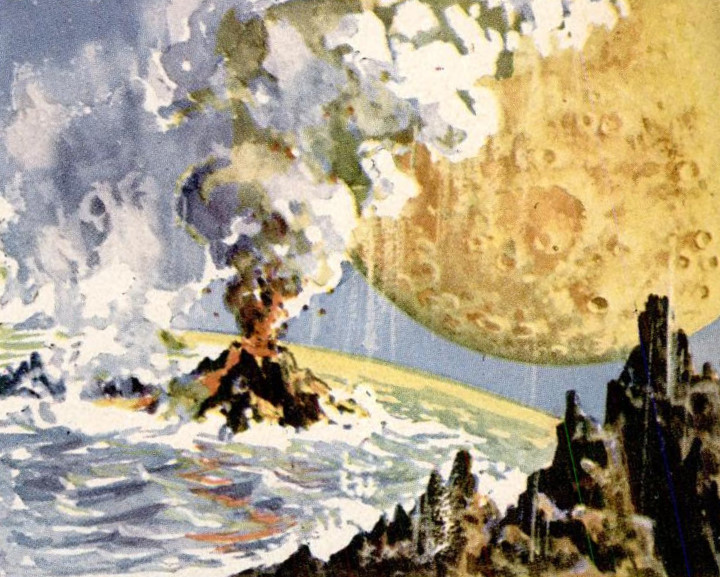
Destabilization of the Earth's crust

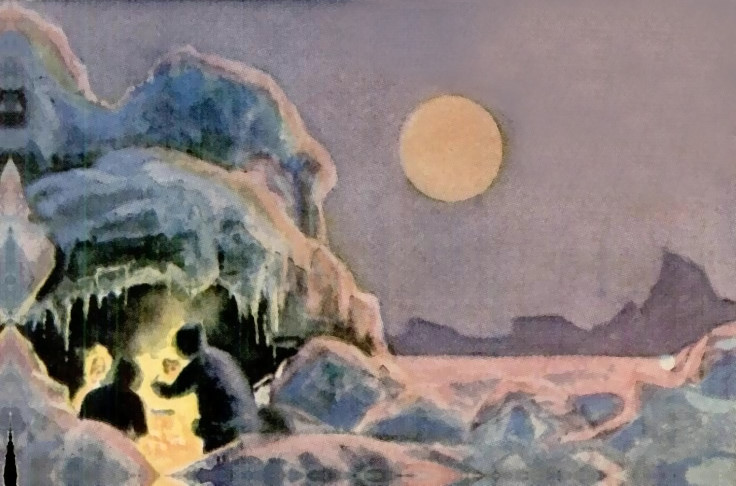
Death of the Sun

By 1940, Seielstad was working for Life magazine and was pictured at work in their 1940 issue commenting that the events of the Second World War were like his first job covering the San Francisco Earthquake. He described his love of "candid-camera" work to aid him in his drawing and how he used the reader's eye like the lens of a camera, "unfolding a scene before it with his drawings".

== Death ==
Seielstad died at Inglewood, Los Angeles, on July 1, 1960, after a long illness.
