= Ernst Schwadron =

Austrian architect (1896–1979)

Ernst Schwadron (1896–1979) was an Austrian architect and interior designer.

== Life and work ==
Schwadron was born in Vienna and was the eldest son of Victor Schwadron, a co-owner of the ceramics company "Brüder Schwadron" with his brother Adolf. Schwadron started working as an architect in Vienna in the late 1920s, focusing on apartment interiors and furniture design, mainly for a wealthy Jewish clientele. His signature interior designs, furniture and lamps were typical of the restrained Viennese modernism of the early 1930s. By the mid-1930s, Schwadron was well established as an architect and his works were published frequently in European architectural and design magazines. In 1938, he fled the Nazis and went to New York. In 1939, he was chief designer for Rena Rosenthal's interior design company. Later, he ran his own design business, Ernst Schwadron Inc. on Madison Avenue for 30 years. Schwadron built one house in the U.S., which he built for himself and his second wife Gladys (Bradshell) in Cold Spring, New York in the late 1940s and which he called "Dream Lake." He died in New York City in 1979 at the age of 82.

== Recognition ==
In the early 1930s, the critic Else Hoffmann called Schwadron, “one of the most hired architects of the younger generation who has created not only apartments for the cultivated Viennese Bourgeoisie but also received diverse commissions abroad such as a hunting lodge for an Indian prince or villas in the former Yugoslavia.” ... “His taste and inventiveness,” she writes, “together with his extraordinary knowledge about materials create apartments of highest functionality and a cultured mood.” She ends her article with a statement that, in hindsight, sounds prophetic, and also bitterly ironic: “great journeys are awaiting Schwadron, journeys that will open up new worlds — and new living circles. And new commissions will present themselves.” After Schwadron escaped the Nazis by moving to the U.S. he received a few interior design commissions such as the design of the offices of the American Crayon Company (with Leopold Kleiner) and remodelling homes of fellow émigrés from Vienna but survived by mainly working in furniture design. His work was published in architectural magazines and reviewed even in the New York Times, but his signature design typical for the restraint modernism of Viennese "domestic lifestyle" ("Wiener Wohnraumkultur") was hardly understood or appreciated in the U.S. He died pretty much forgotten in the architectural world albeit his furniture pieces can still to be found in auction houses.

== Selected works ==
=== Private buildings and homes ===
- 1928 Beach house Lederer in Greifenstein, Austria
- 1930 Redesign of the home of the painter Erna Lederer, Vienna
- 1935 Pfeffer House, Bratislava (with Bedrich Weinwurm and Ignac Vecsei)
- Around 1950 Schwadron House, Cold Spring, New York

=== Public buildings ===
- 1933 redesign Rotenturm Kino (movie theater), Fleischmarkt 1, Vienna

=== Industrial/office buildings ===
- Around 1935 he remodelled the meat shop Karl Bogner, Wien 16, Friedmanngasse 16 (destroyed), the bakery Bäckerei J. Senft, Wien 3, Erdbergstraße 59 (destroyed), shop Otto Reich, Wien 9, Alserstraße 30 (destroyed) and the clothing store Hahn, Vienna.

=== Interior design ===
- 1927 Coffee house in Vienna (w. ceramics by Vally Wieselthier)
- 1930 Ernst Schwadron apartment, Wien 1, Franz-Josefs-Kai 3
- 1933 Apartment for the Dosza family, Vienna, Theresianumgasse 11
- 1933 Wittels apartment, Vienna 3, Veithgasse 9
- 1934 Dr. Wolf apartment, Wien 1, Jasomirgottstraße
- 1944 Offices for the American Crayon Company, New York, USA (with Leopold Kleiner)
- 1946 Apartment of Emmy Zweybrück, New York, USA (w. Leopold Kleiner)
- after 1941 Various interiors in New York, USA

== Quotes ==
"The apartment of an architect should be a teaser for future clients, it should include a piece of family tradition, accommodate several collections and have a summer and winter garden. Last but not least, it has to be a pleasant and practical work and living space for the inhabitant."

== Literature ==
- Margarethe Winterling, Ernst Schwadron 1896–1971. thesis Vienna 2002
- Heidrun Holzfeind, BAWAG Contemporary, 2012
