= Rena Rosenthal =

American businesswoman (1880–1966)

Rena Rosenthal (1880–1966) was a trend-setting American retailer and businesswoman. Known principally for her exclusive Madison Avenue retail shop in New York City, she was an influential arbiter of taste and fashion in the interior decorating world, particularly during the introduction of modernism to North America.

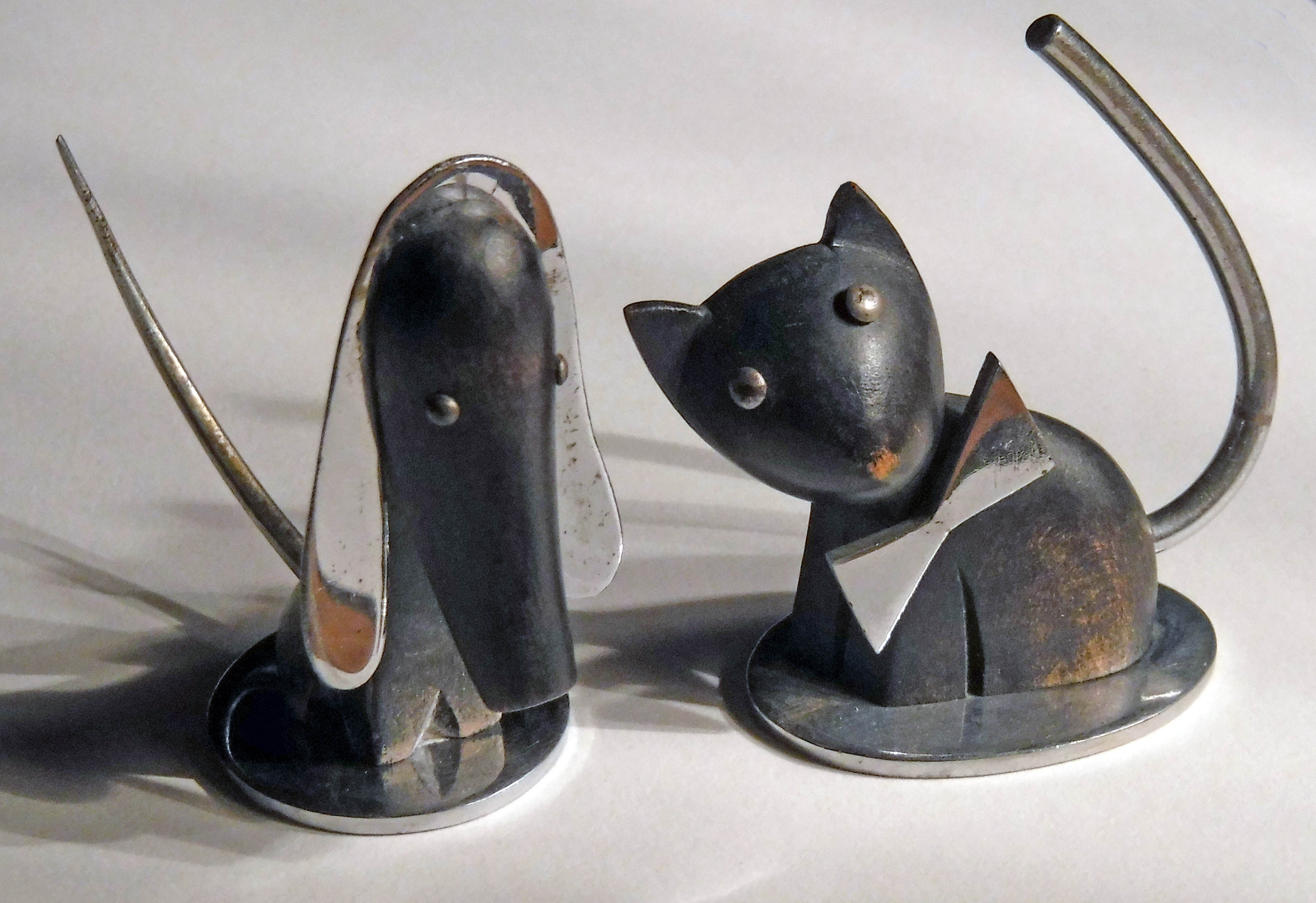
Cigarette stubbers sold by Rena Rosenthal, designed by Karl Hagenauer

== Biography ==
Austrian corkscrew sold by Rena Rosenthal around 1931

Born Rena Kahn in New York City, Rena Rosenthal was the oldest child of Jacob (Jacques) and Eugenie Kahn and sister of architect Ely Jacques Kahn.

Rena Rosenthal was a promoter of applied arts in the modernist style whose patronage helped launch the careers of such noted designers as Donald Deskey, Tommi Parzinger, Ernst Schwadron and Russel Wright.

She established the Austrian Workshop, later Rena Rosenthal Studio and then Rena Rosenthal Gallery. She retailed exclusive handcrafted glass, porcelain, fabric, metal and wood objects for home adornment through her shop at 520 (later 438) Madison Avenue. Many of these items were sourced in her father's and husband's native Austria; her shop distributed wares from the Wiener Werkstätte and from the Viennese designer Karl Hagenauer. She introduced the work of Austrian enamel artist Mizi Otten to North America, and was an early promoter of English potter and painter T. S. Haile. Despite much published misinformation to the contrary, Rena Rosenthal is not associated in any way with the "backward R/forward R" trademark (of Richard Rohac) found on Vienna bronze objects.

She loaned German pottery and Austrian metalwork items to the Worcester Art Museum's third annual exhibit of modern decorative arts, in 1929.

While she is known now principally for her exclusive retail shop (regular advertisements were seen in House & Garden and Harpers magazines), her business was listed over the years in New York directories under "Painters & Decorators" and "Gift Shops", and in Chicago under "Art Goods."

Rena Rosenthal was an influential arbiter of taste and fashion in the interior decorating world, particularly during the introduction of modernism to North America. She handled art works that ended up in collections of notable individuals like Geoffrey Beene and institutions such as the Cooper-Hewitt Smithsonian Design Museum.

== Literature ==
- Rosenthal, Rudolph and Helena L. Ratzka (1948). The Story of Modern Applied Art. New York: Harper & Brothers.
