= Cigar tube =

Storage container for cigars

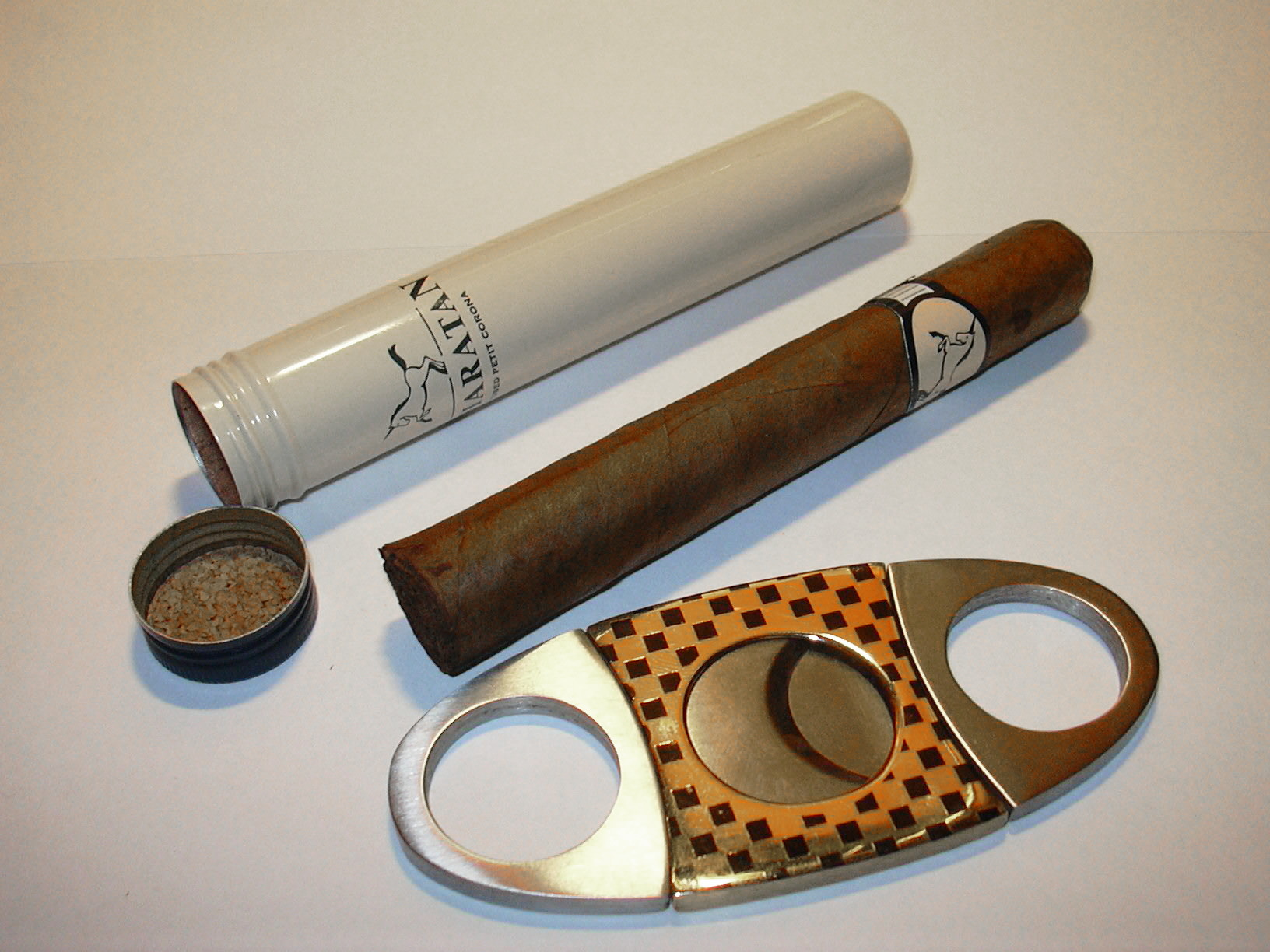
A cigar with an airtight storage tube and a double guillotine-style cutter

A cigar tube is a tube container for cigar packaging. Traditionally cigar tubes have been made of aluminium or porcelain.

A double guillotine-style cutter, used for cutting the tip of a cigar, next to a hand-rolled H. Upmann Coronas Major cigar. The "Made in Cuba" label (see Cuban cigar) is visible on the lower tube.

Cigar Tubes are used to carry small numbers of cigars, typically one or five, referred to by their number of "fingers". They are usually made from stainless steel, and used for short durations. For longer, a built in humidifier and hygrometer is used.

In Sick Puppy Palmer blames Desi's aversion to cigar smoking on then-President Bill Clinton, "and his twisted bimbos," a reference to Monica Lewinsky's allegation that Clinton penetrated her with a Cigar tube.
