= Cigar cutter watch fob =

Tool

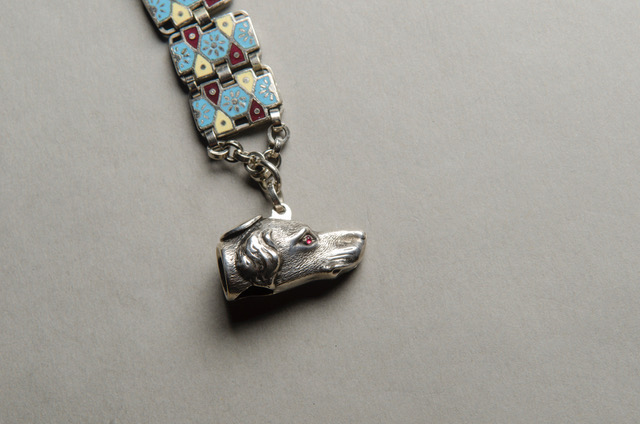
Dog Wedge Figural cigar cutter watch fob from the collection of Theodore Schuster

A cigar cutter watch fob is a decorative and utilitarian pendant that is attached to the opposite side of a chain as a pocket watch. It is used to cleanly cut the end of a cigar so it burns evenly.

Pocket watches were the most common type of portable timepiece from their invention in the 1500s right up until the advent of the wristwatch after World War I. The first wristwatches were modified pocket watches with flanges attached to their sides to which a band was attached. Pocket watches typically were connected to a fob or a chain, and as the popularity and production of the timepieces increased, so did the production of various types of decorative watch fobs. In the 19th and 20th centuries over 500 million pocket watches of various types and qualities were produced in America. This number was far surpassed by watch production in Europe, with an estimated 400,000 pocket watches produced each year. With the standardization of time, men and women of all classes throughout the world used these time keeping devices.

Both men's and women's watches were commonly attached to decorative fobs. However, because women were discouraged from smoking in public, it was primarily men who wore the cigar cutter variety. The men's pocket watch was most ordinarily carried in a watch pocket (still seen today in some suit vests and most jeans). It was almost always attached to a chain to secure the pocket watch against falling or theft while still having it readily available. Fobs at the ends of these chains became prevalent for various reasons, one of which was to hold a cigar cutter for men to prepare their cigars for smoking. The cigar cutter trimmed the end of the cigar with a knife blade, scissors or slicer and/or poked a hole with a sharp needle-like piercer.

The watch fob version of the cigar cutter falls into similar categories as those of the larger handheld or countertop cigar cutters.

- Guillotine (straight cut/single or double blades)
- Punch cut
- Piercer
- Knives
- Wedge cut (a.k.a. notch cut, cat's eye, V cut, English cut)

What separates cigar cutter watch fobs from any other cigar cutters are their size. First, it must fit on the end of chain or leather strap and second, it needs to have a ring or small hole to attach it to that chain or strap. The fob was ordinarily left to dangle on the outside of the vest or trouser pocket to be worn as a status symbol and/or to make it easier to grasp and retrieve the watch.

As pocket watches proliferated, cigar cutter watch fobs frequently became a status symbol. Elaborate workmanship with intricate carvings, precious gems, and a wide diversity of design categories, gives them a miniaturized and mechanized beauty that outweighs their function. Many of these fobs have a sense of whimsy and are considered fine art pieces created to showcase the craftsman's imagination and ingenuity. They were made of range from fine metals like gold, silver and platinum, while more affordable versions were forged of baser metals like brass, copper and steel.

The use of pocket watches has all but disappeared but there is still a lively marketplace for discerning collectors. As an adjunct endeavor there are also a number of discriminating collectors of cigar cutter watch fobs.
