= Trench watch =

Early wristwatch design used in World War I

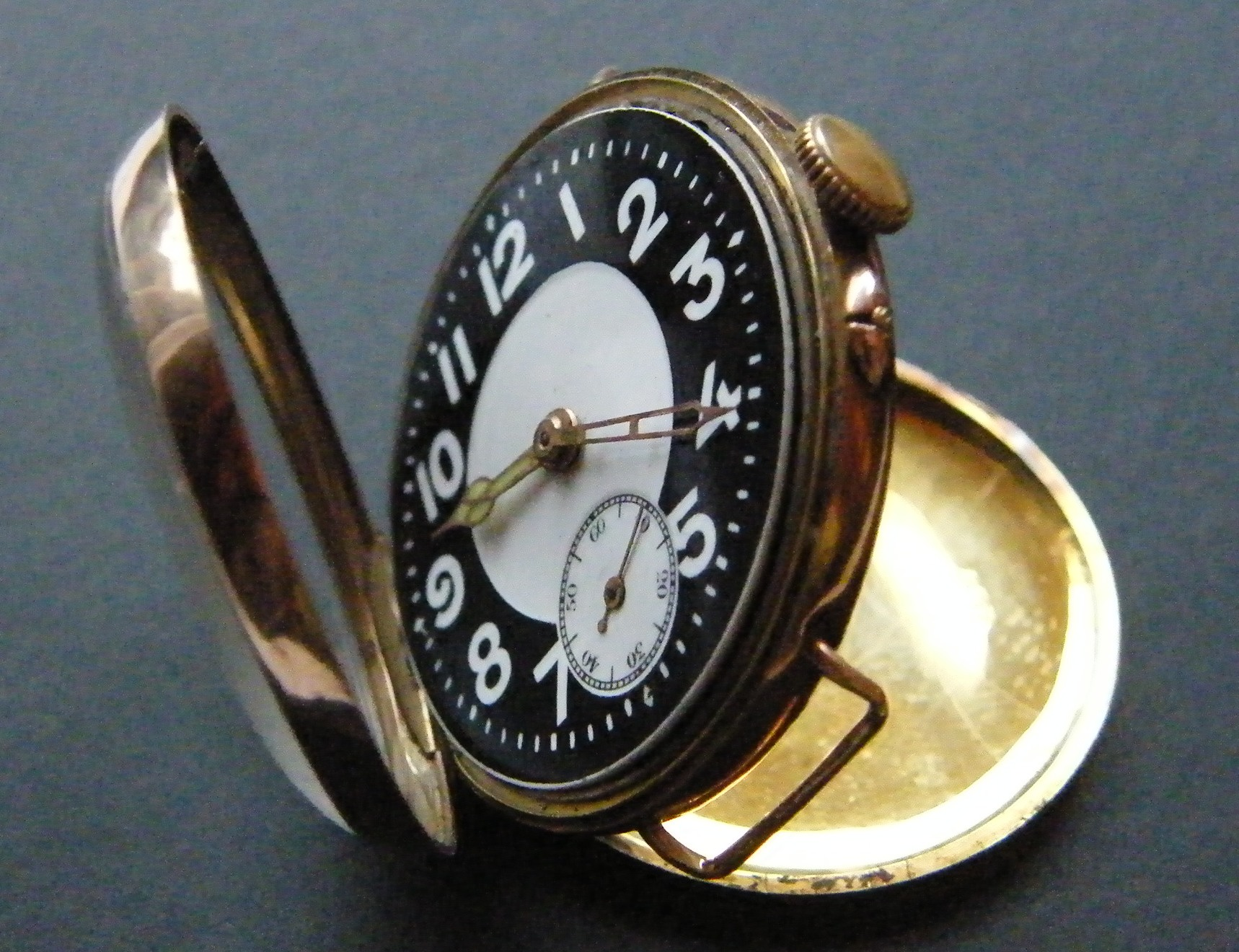
Gold trench watch, 1916

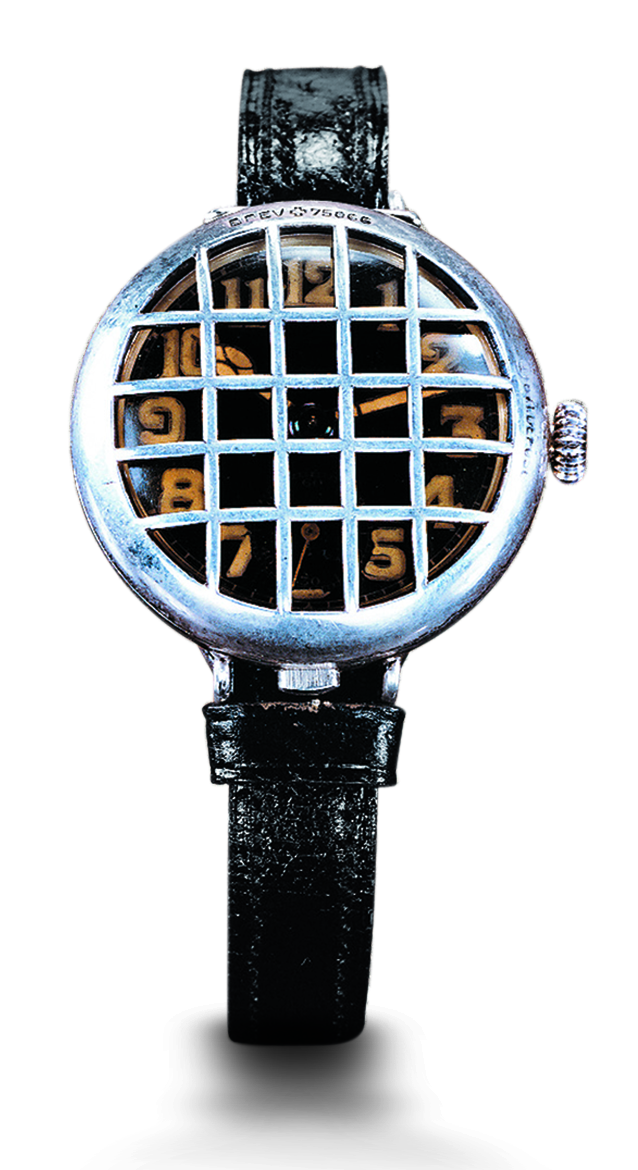
Trench watch with shrapnel guard (“mesh guard” or “watch protector”). These were used before the introduction of the more hard wearing plexiglass introduced in the 1930s

The trench watch (wristlet) is a type of watch that came into use by the military during World War I, as pocket watches were not practical in combat. It was a transitional design between pocket watches and wristwatches, incorporating features of both.

== Background ==
The first watch adapted to be worn on the wrist was made in 1810 by Abraham-Louis Breguet, commissioned by Caroline Bonaparte, Queen of Naples. The first series of purpose-made men’s wristwatches was produced by Girard-Perregaux in 1880 for the German Navy. During World War I numerous companies, including Omega, Longines, Elgin and others produced wristwatches for the military. Rolex also produced trench watches. These watches were of virtually identical style with an enamel dial, wide white numerals and a luminescent radium hour hand. (Note: "[P]owered by radium salts so that it glowed strongly all the time" without resort to sun exposure. While the luminescence only lasted three or four years, the radium paint dials should be treated as radioactive and dangerous.) Often they did not bear the name of the manufacturer, though the movement, originally designed in the 1890s for ladies’ pendant watches, was marked "Swiss". (Note: "A book published during the war as early as 1916 "Knowledge for War: Every officer's handbook for the front" by Captain B. C. Lake of the King's Own Scottish Borderers included the list of Officer's Kit shown in the picture. The first item on the list, ahead of otherwise indispensable items such as "Revolver" and "Field glasses" is "Luminous wristwatch with unbreakable glass". The presence of luminous paint and an unbreakable crystal became the signature features of a trench or "Service" watch, and featured prominently in adverts during the war.")

From pocket watches those trench watches inherited hinged front and back covers. The lugs for a strap looked like a thick wire attachment to the classical round shape of pocket watches rather than an integrated part of the body of the later and modern wristwatches.

The name "wristlet" was used until the early 1930s and was eventually replaced by the modern name "wristwatch".

== Gallery ==
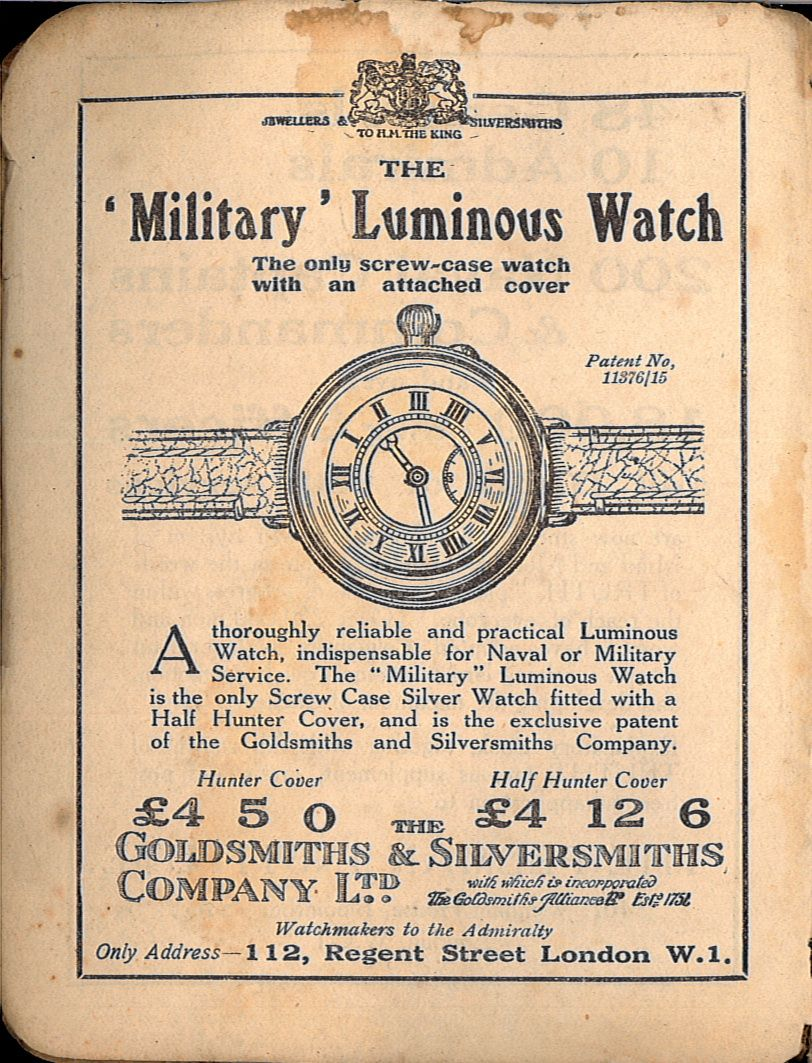
Advertisement, 1918

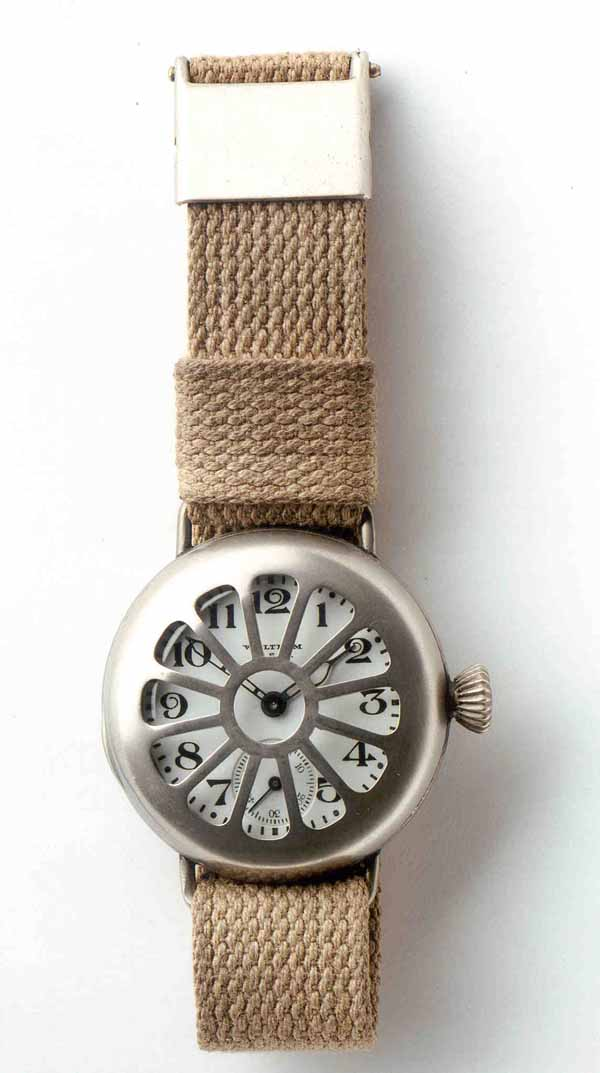
Waltham USA trench watch with shrapnel guard, 1914

== See also ==
- Direction finding watch
- Military time zone
- Sector clock
- 24-hour analog dial
