= Richard Rohac =

Richard Rohac (1906–1956) was an Austrian designer and master metal craftsman.

== Identity controversy ==
Richard Rohac was virtually unknown outside of Austria in his lifetime. His work was sold internationally with only his logo (and "Made in Austria") to identify its source, a common enough practice at the time. This anonymity led to Rohac's design work being mistakenly attributed to someone else with the same initials. In his 1996 reference book Art Deco Sculpture & Metalware, Alfred W. Edward presented eleven colour plates of Rohac's work, captioned as bearing the "Rena Rosenthal touchmark." This "touchmark" was actually the maker's mark of Richard Rohac (mirror image capital Rs inside of a box), which Edward illustrated on page 67 of his book.

Confusion persists on this point in the antiques world despite the emergence of the truth documented in several sources. In his 1999 reference work The Ultimate Corkscrew Book, Donald A. Bull includes photographs of two figural corkscrews, a cat and a dog, and describes the trademark as "backward R/forward R." Ten years later, in Figural Corkscrews, Bull pictures the same two items, and four others, captioned "with the trademark of Richard Rohac." The mistaken attribution is mentioned in Corkscrews (2009). In her 2011 exhibit catalogue, art historian and journalist Olga Kronsteiner expressly contradicts the Rena Rosenthal attribution.

== Career ==
Rohac began and completed his apprenticeship with Werkstätte Hagenauer Wien in Vienna as a teenager, and stayed with the workshop another nine years before opening his own metalwork business in 1932.

Rohac's career was interrupted by military service and a period of internment in Greece. On his return to Vienna, he reopened his workshop and began producing the types of household items that had been lost or destroyed during wartime bombings. Products from this period are likely to be stamped "ROHAC WIEN."

When a market emerged again for decorative objects, Rohac turned his talents to the design and production of busts and sculptures, as well as everything from desk and smoking accessories to corkscrews to bookends to pretzel holders to candlesticks. He specialized in exotic – for the 1950s – African and Asian figures, and jungle animals. His "backward R/forward R" maker's mark dates to that period, and appears on objects sold internationally through the export company Gebr. Gödde (Gödde Brothers).

Rohac's work was featured in an American newsreel on Austrian arts and crafts; one of his African busts was a state gift from Austria to the president of Mexico.

He died in Vienna in 1956.

== Literature ==
- Bull, Donald A. (1996). Figural Corkscrews. Atglen: Schiffer. ISBN 978-0-7643-3315-6.
- Edward, Alfred W. (1996). Art Deco Sculpture & Metalware. Atglen: Schiffer. ISBN 0-88740-994-6.
- Robinson, Sal and Wayne Meadows (2015). Austrian Figural Corkscrew Design: Auböck ∙ Bosse ∙ Hagenauer ∙ Rohac. Vancouver: Kitsilano Cellars. ISBN 978-0-9689294-1-4.
