= Tommi Parzinger =

Tommi Anton Parzinger (1903–1981) was a German furniture designer and painter. Born in Munich in 1903, he later moved to New York City in 1932, starting his first company in 1939. He had begun by designing for Manhattan style-setter Rena Rosenthal. His works were collected by famous clients, including Billy Baldwin, Marilyn Monroe, and a number of high-fashion New York families. Parzinger's last showroom, on East 57th Street, was closed not long after his death in 1981. His focus turned to Expressionist painting during the final 15 years of his life, no longer working on designing furniture.

The company Parzinger had created, Parzinger Originals, was given to his friend Donald Cameron. Pat Palumbo, the owner of the gallery that sold Parzinger's pieces, worked with Cameron after Parzinger's death on reproductions of his work based on his original working sketches.

== Career ==
Parzinger first came to the United States from Bavaria in 1935. He then started his own company that focused on designing original types of household silverware. Most of the silverware he made in the company was custom, "hand-hammering" them from sheet metal. A 1939 LIFE article stated that his silverware was unique in its "light, graceful feeling and fine etched decoration". The article went on to state that Parzinger, at the time, was recognized as the "most creative original designer of silverware in the United States".

During this same time period, Parzinger also began working on building furniture and accessories to go with the pieces. His furniture then went on exhibition at the 1939 New York World's Fair. The main years of his company saw Parzinger developing a new furniture line every year, which usually consisted of 12 to 30 items, with a number of them being custom designs, even though they were sold commercially as well.

== Style ==
Parzinger's works were titled "high-style modernism", which represented a "more idiosyncratic, rarefied midcentury design". Most of the pieces he created were custom-built for large studios, with Parzinger using "cosmopolitan-looking designs, involving costly, craft-intensive materials and processes like brass work and lacquer".
