= Cigar lighter =

Cigar lighter may refer to:

- Cigarette lighter receptacle or Cigar lighter receptacle, initially designed to power an electrically heated cigarette lighter and became a de facto standard 12 VDC connector to supply electrical power for portable accessories used in or near an automobile
- Lighter, a portable device used to create a flame
