= Cigar cutter =

Cutter for cigars

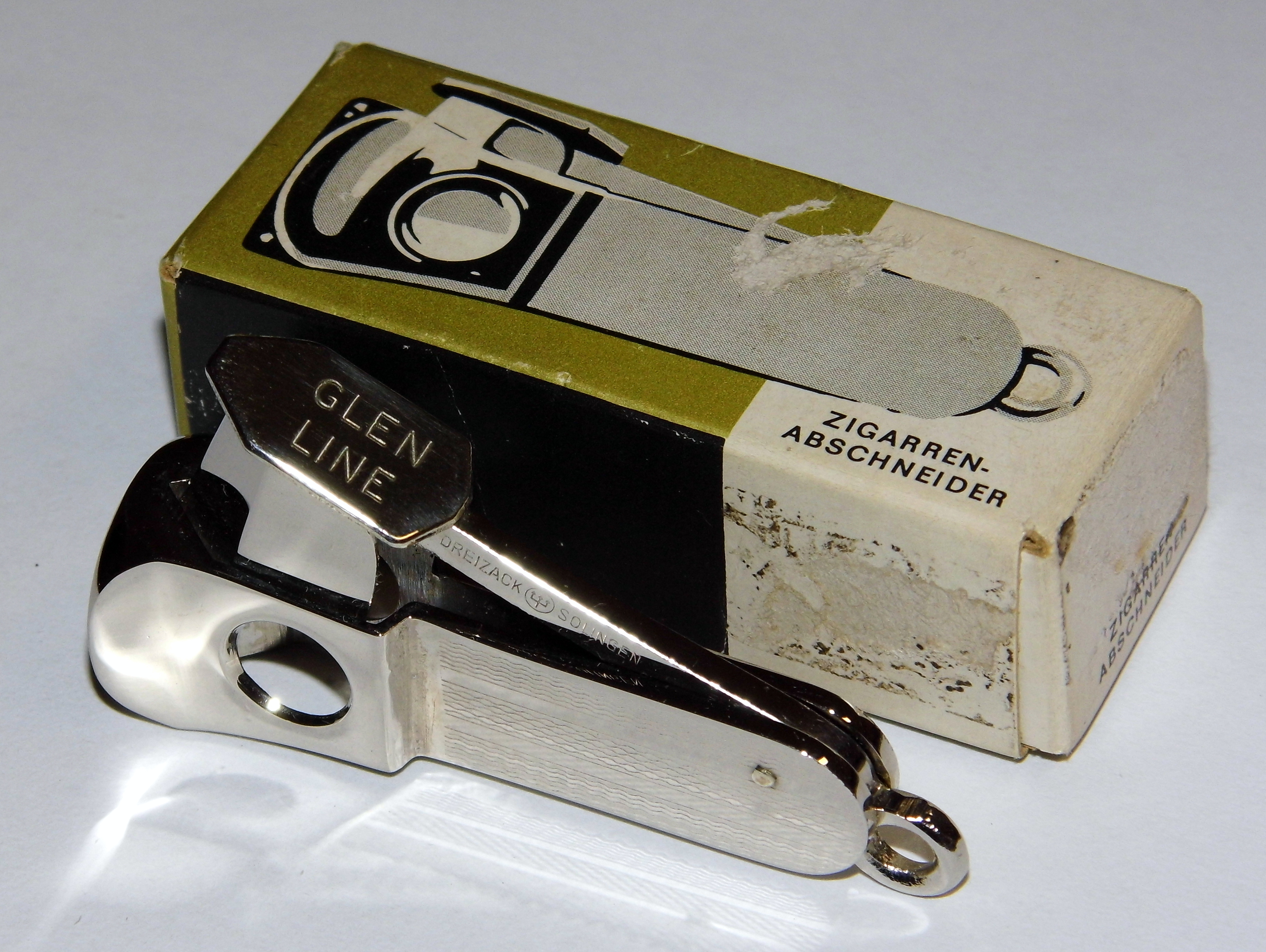
- Vintage Cigar Cutter Made in Western Germany, Dreizack Solingen, Zigarren-Abschneider

Overview
- Type: Cutting tool / Smoking accessory
- Function: Trimming the cigar cap prior to smoking
- Common variants: Guillotine (cigar cutter); Guillotine (Straight cut); Punch cut; V-cut; Cigar scissors
- Related items: Cigar; Cigar case; Cigar lighter

A cigar cutter is a mechanical device designed to cut one end off a cigar so that it may be properly smoked. Although some cigars are cut on both ends, or twirled at both ends, the vast majority come with one straight cut end and one end in a "cap" which must be cut off for the cigar to be smoked. Most quality handmade cigars, regardless of shape, will have a cap which is one or more small pieces of a wrapper pasted onto one end of the cigar with either a natural tobacco paste or with a mixture of flour and water. The cap end of a cigar is the rounded end without the tobacco exposed, and this is the end one should always cut. The cap may be cut with a knife or bitten off, but if the cap is cut jaggedly or without care, the end of the cigar will not burn evenly and smokeable tobacco will be lost.

== Types ==
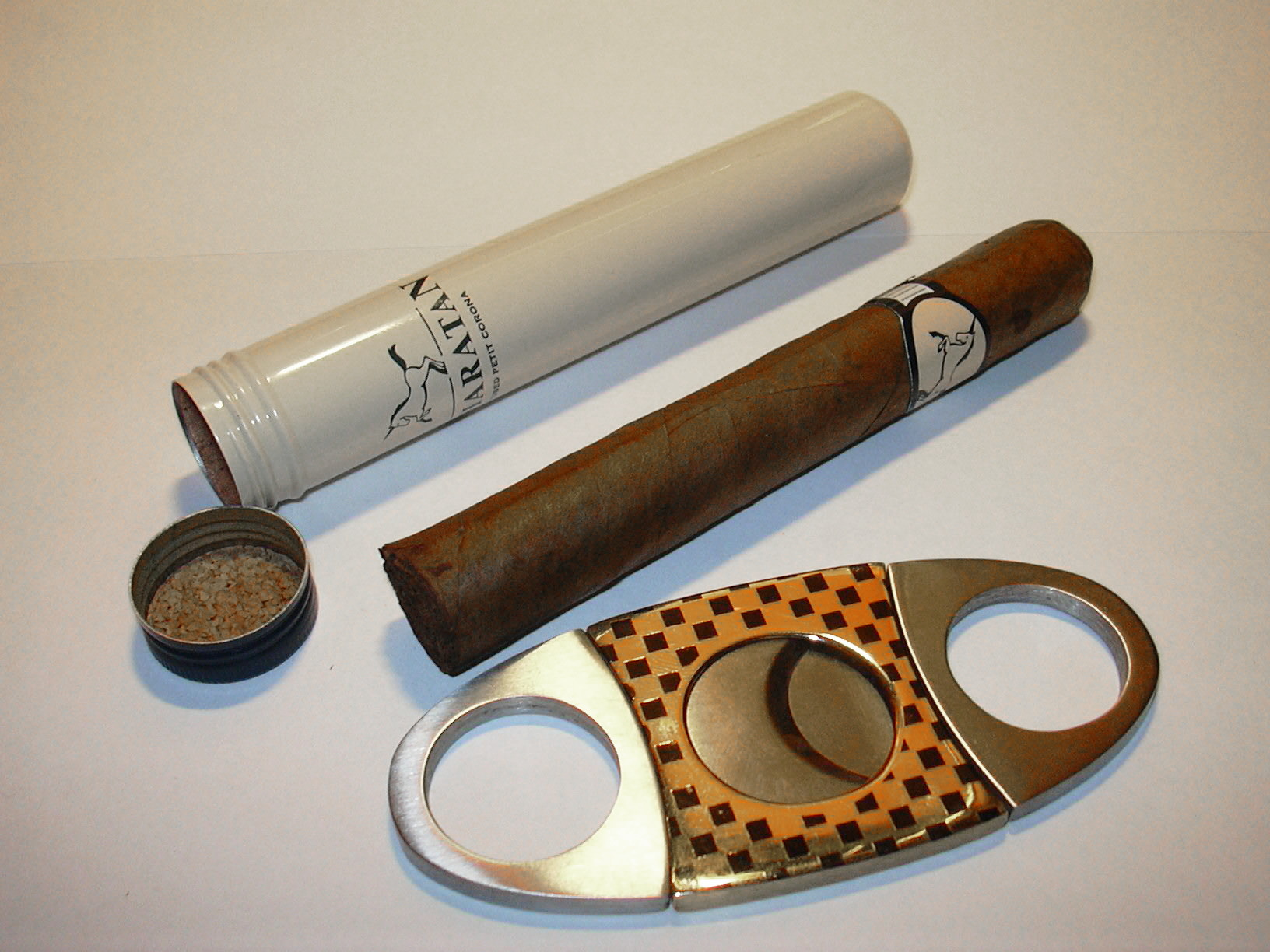
A semi-airtight cigar storage tube and a double guillotine-style cutter

There are three basic types :

- Guillotine (straight cut)
- Punch
- V-cut (a.k.a. notch cut, cat's eye, wedge cut, English cut)

=== Straight cut ===
The straight cut is the most common, usually used on cigars with a smaller ring gauge. A straight cut leaves both ends of the cigar exposed. The double blade guillotine is preferred by many aficionados over the single blade, because it usually makes a cleaner cut. Cigar scissors are also used to make straight cuts, and may be the best choice for cutting the cigar with exactness. However, the guillotines are usually the most practical, the least expensive, and can be easily and safely carried in shirt or trouser pockets. Most prefer this cut because the entire cap end is exposed, which allows for maximum smoke to exit with only minimum buildup occurring around the edge.

=== Punch cut ===
This cut is preferred by some, as it exposes less of the filler and binder and reduces the chance of tobacco ending up in the mouth. Critics of this cut maintain that the smaller hole does not allow as much smoke to come out and the hole is often clogged with a saliva and tobacco buildup. Some don't consider these to be cigar cutters at all, as they not cut (action) but rather core or punch.

There are three basic types of cigar punches: a bullet punch, Havana punch, and multi-punch.

The bullet punch is a bullet-shaped device that fits on a keychain. The punch can be twisted to expose a circular blade, used to cut a hole in the cigar cap. One problem associated with these otherwise handy, durable and inexpensive devices is that the unscrewable top is easy to lose, leaving the blade exposed in the user's pocket.

"Havana punches" offer some of the same convenience as the bullet punch, but with more safety. Rather than an easy-to-lose top, the blade is recessed and springs out at the push of a button. Multi-punches offer different-sized punch holes for different sizes of cigars.

=== V-cut ===
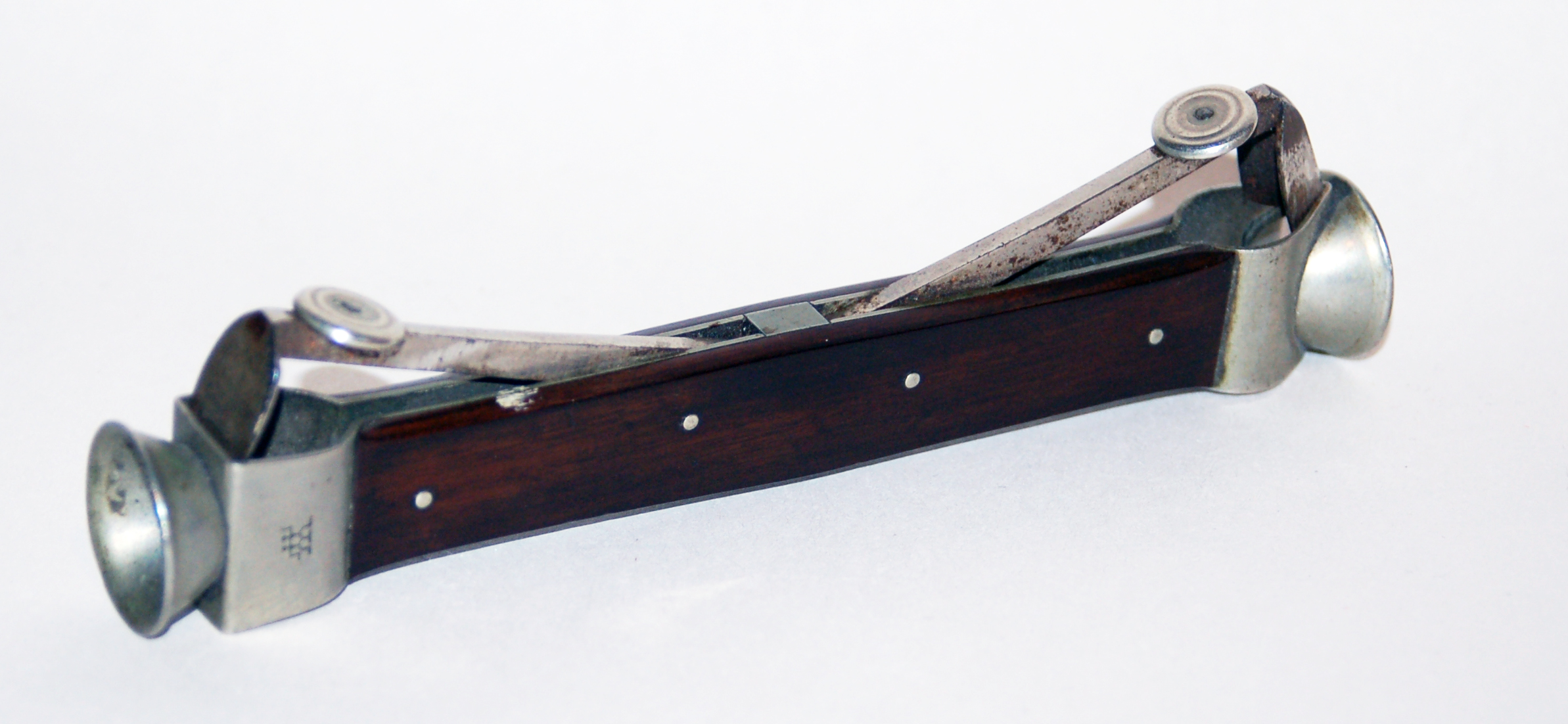
A rosewood-sided dual-ended cigar cutter by J.A. Henckels capable of making both straight cuts and V-cuts

V-cutters look like guillotine cutters, but they cut a wedge into the cigar cap rather than completely removing it, creating a clean-looking gash. The V-cutter was originally designed for pyramid-shaped vitolas. This type of cutter allows the smoker to get a deep cut into the V-shaped cigar. Good V-cutters penetrate deeper into the filler than straight cutters, and some smokers prefer them for thicker-gauge cigars too. However, cheap V-cutters can result in sloppy cuts too deep into the cigar, which result in an uneven burn.

== History ==
Frederick William Fairholt, in his 1859 book Tobacco: Its History and Association, describes an early cigar cutter as follows:

In Berlin, a few years ago, an ingenious pocket- knife, entirely of steel, was fabricated for the use of cigar-smokers, of which we here give an engraving.

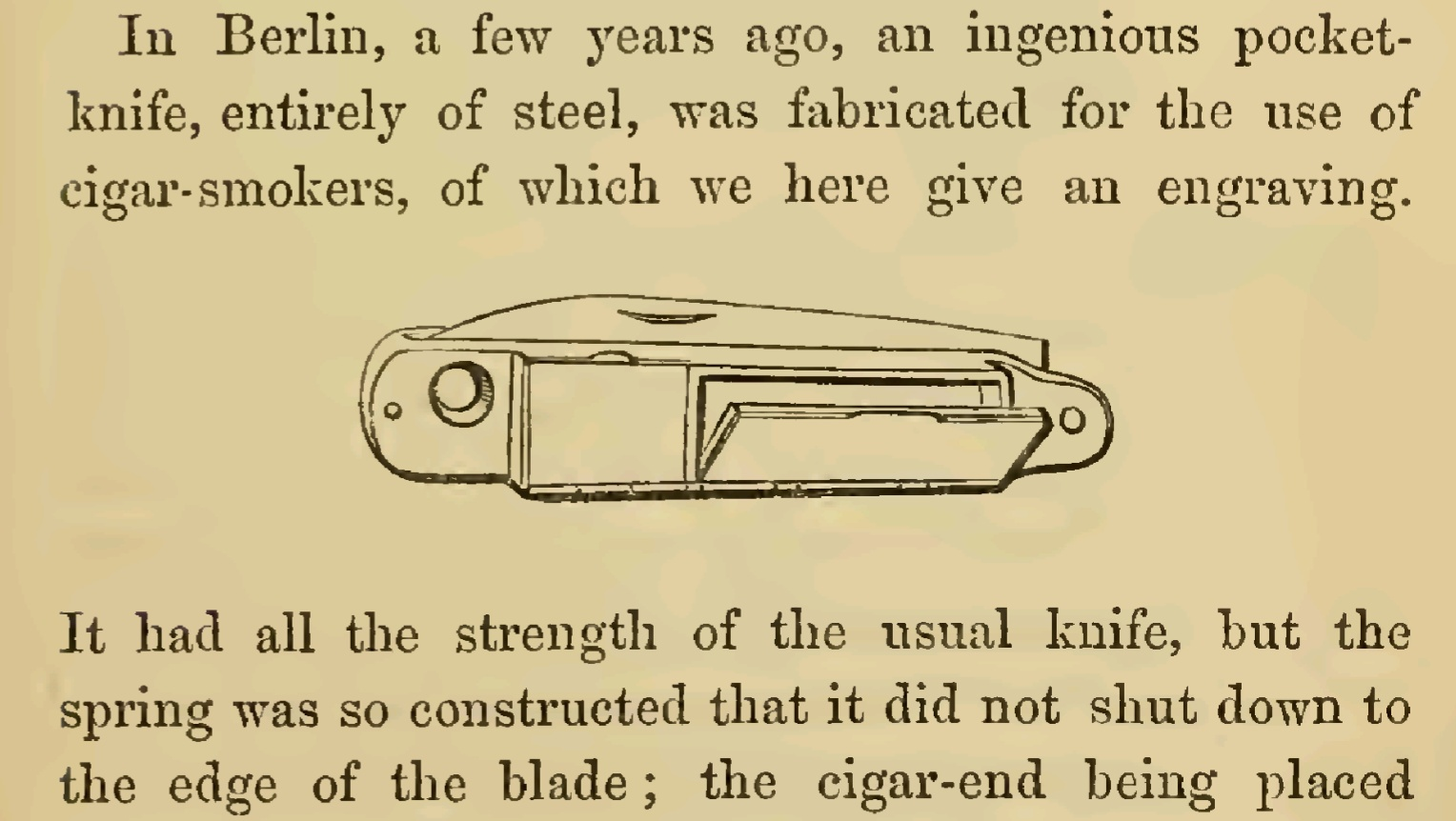
1850's Engraving of a Tobacco Cutter from p. 223 of Tobacco: Its History and Association by Frederick William Fairholt

It had all the strength of the usual knife, but the spring was so constructed that it did not shut down to the edge of the blade; the cigar-end being placed through the aperture at the end, the point of the knife, on being pressed down by the finger, cut off the end of the cigar. On one side of the handle was a thin flat box, with a division; the longer one (open in the cut) contained fusees (sic), the smaller (represented closed) held German tinder; the fusee was lighted by rubbing along the rough edge of this shallow box, which did not give more weight or thickness to the handle than a strong pocket-knife usually exhibits."

Fairholt also describes a variation on the cigar cutter watch fob:

Another simple little implement, to act as cigar-cutter and holder... The double cutter at one side takes off the end of the cigar, and, when closed, acts as a hold for the finger and thumb, the opposite arms closing round the cigar and securing it very firmly. A small loop on one of the cutters allows it to be attached to the watch-chain if desired.

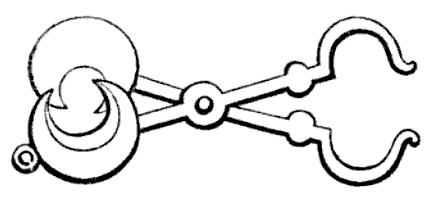
Illustration of a nineteenth century cigar cutter, published in 1859.

== Danger of injury ==
It is possible to receive a severe injury from a poorly handled cigar cutter. In 1999, basketball star Michael Jordan injured a finger with a cigar cutter which some believe led to his second retirement.
