= Werkstätte Hagenauer Wien =

Austrian decoration business

Werkstätte Hagenauer Wien - (wHw) - was a family business in Vienna that produced fine, handcrafted objects for decoration and use over its nearly ninety-year history. The workshop closed in 1987 but the company's retail premises, opened in 1938 on Vienna's Opernring, survives today as a museum and shop.

== Carl Hagenauer ==
Carl Hagenauer (1872 - 1928) founded what became the Werkstätte Hagenauer Wien in 1898. He began as an apprentice at Würbel & Czokally, a silverware producer in Vienna. He then trained as a goldsmith before founding his own business, one of many in Vienna producing small figurines and useful objects. His workshop produced his own designs and those of other artists such as Josef Hoffmann and Otto Prutscher. His sons Karl (1898 - 1956) and Franz (1906 - 1986) both became renowned designers.

== Karl Hagenauer ==
Cigarette stubber or seal in the form of a skier, designed by Karl Hagenauer, about 1930

Karl was an influential designer in the Art Deco style. He enrolled at the Vienna School of Applied Arts at age eleven. He studied with Josef Hoffmann and Oskar Strnad and created designs for the Wiener Werkstätte art collective. After wartime service in the infantry, he resumed his training and qualified as an architect. He joined the family business in 1919 and soon took on leadership in both design and management.

Karl Hagenauer was responsive to the change in public taste influenced by the popularity of the Vienna Secession. His stylized animals and whimsical creatures (reminiscent of Wiener Werkstätte designer Dagobert Peche) handcrafted in brass had broad appeal in domestic and American markets. Some were useful, such as mirrors, cigar cutters, ashtrays, cigarette stubbers - many in the form of athletes or animals, candlesticks, corkscrews, bookends, and lamp bases. Figurines, hood ornaments and other larger sculptures in wood and metal (such as the iconic Josephine Baker in the collection of the Casa Lis Art Nouveau and Art Deco Museum in Salamanca) were purely decorative.

He designed the company’s trademark encircled "wHw" and registered it in 1927. The first catalogue to use the trademark dates to 1928, the year his father died and Karl assumed leadership of the business. The company later expanded to produce furniture, chiefly designed by Julius Jirasek.

Karl's designs were popular enough to be reproduced and marketed by counterfeiters in the 1930s and more recently.

Karl Hagenauer's work found an avid American market partly through the efforts of New York gallery owner Rena Rosenthal, who featured the Josephine Baker sculpture in a 1935 window display. He made two voyages to New York to visit her in the 1930s and stamped some of the merchandise retailed through her store with a custom "RENA" mark in addition to his trademark "wHw." Rosenthal's patronage was critical to the post-war success of the Werkstätte Hagenauer; the hostilities caused a delay of several years in her payment for a last container of products shipped in 1938, and the subsequent change in exchange rate was very advantageous to the Austrian firm, supporting rebuilding efforts. The company turned to the production of metal objects and furniture needed for the restoration of houses and other structures damaged or destroyed in the war. The 1950s saw a reintroduction to the more decorative products.

== Franz Hagenauer ==
While Karl was the principal designer of everyday objects (and some sculptures), his younger brother Franz specialized in sculpture. Franz Hagenauer also studied from an early age with Franz Cižek at Vienna's School of Applied Arts, and joined the family business at age twenty. His interest and talent lay in sculpture with sheet metals rather than cast figures, and later in his career he was head of metalwork and metal design classes at the Academy of Applied Arts.

Franz took over the running of the company after Karl died in 1956.

== Apprentices and associates ==
Julius Jirasek (1896 - 1965) was an Austrian architect who trained under Oskar Strnad and Josef Frank at the Vienna School of Applied Arts. He also designed jewellery, ceramics and glassware. Jirasek spent the thirty years from 1930 to 1960 with the Werkstätte Hagenauer, where he was responsible for furniture and utensils.

Richard Rohac (1906 - 1956) was a master metal craftsman and designer who apprenticed at the Werkstätte Hagenauer Wien from the age of fourteen. He remained with the company until 1932, when he opened his own workshop and gained master certification. Following the war, the Richard Rohac Company produced a wide range of decorative and practical objects in brass, which served both domestic and overseas markets. His work, along with that of his business partner enamel artist Elfi Müller, was the subject of an American newsreel item in the 1950s.

Karl Schmidt (born 1948) is a sculptor, painter and industrial designer. In 1962, he began a four-year apprenticeship in brass work under his professor, Franz Hagenauer. He went on to manage the workshop and then the company on Franz's death, until 1987. He founded his own workshop in Vienna in 1987, and then Atelier Karl Schmidt in Neudorf in 2009.

== Recognition ==
- 1923 Prima Mostra Biennale Internazionale delle Arti Decorative, Monza (Diploma)
- 1925 Exposition Internationale des Arts Décoratifs et Industriels Modernes, Paris (Silver and Bronze medal)
- 1927 World's Fair, Philadelphia (Gold medal)
- 1934 Austrian State Prize
- 1937 World Fair, Paris (Grand Prix)
- 1948 Triennale, Milan (Gran Premio)
- 1951 Triennale, Milan (two Gold medals and a Silver medal)
- 1954 Triennale, Milan (Gold medal)
- 1957 Triennale, Milan (Silver medal)
- 1958 World's Fair, Brussels (Gold medal)

== Exhibitions ==
- 1938 Österreichische Werkkunst der Gegenwart, Mannheim
- 1971 Austrian Museum of Applied Arts, Vienna
- 1986 Würthle Gallery, Vienna
- 2011 Otto Wagner Museum, Vienna

== Literature ==
- Edward, Alfred W. (1996). Art Deco Sculptures & Metalware. Atglen: Schiffer.
- Kronsteiner, Olga (2011). Hagenauer, Wiener Moderne und neue sachlichkeit. Vienna: Wagner:Werk Museum. ISBN 978-3-200022614.
- Robinson, Sal and Wayne Meadows (2015). Austrian Figural Corkscrew Design: Auböck ∙ Bosse ∙ Hagenauer ∙ Rohac. Vancouver: Kitsilano Cellars. ISBN 978-0-9689294-1-4.
- Breinsberg, Erich (2016). Franz Hagenauer - die singuläre Kunst. Vienna: mymorawa. ISBN 978-3-9905706-9-2.
