= Josiah (given name) =

- Gender: Male

Origin
- Word/name: Hebrew
- Meaning: "God has healed"

Josiah (/dʒoʊˈsaɪə/) is a masculine given name derived from the Hebrew Yoshi-yahu (Hebrew: יֹאשִׁיָּהוּ, Modern: Yošiyyáhu, Tiberian: Yôšiyyāhû, "Yahweh has healed".

Josiah was a King of Judah in the Bible. The Latin form Josias was used in some early English translations of the Bible.

Josiah was among the five most popular names given to boys born to Black mothers in the United States state of Virginia in 2023.

== Notable people with the given name ==
=== A ===
- Josiah Abavu (born 1987), Papua New Guinean rugby league footballer
- Josiah Gardner Abbott (1814–1891), American politician
- Josiah Alexander (1826–1882), English cricketer
- Josiah Allick (born 2001), American basketball player
- Josiah M. Anderson (1807–1861), American politician
- Josiah Haynes Armstrong (1842–1898), American bishop
- Josiah D. Arnold (1820–1903), American businessman and politician

=== B ===
- Josiah Howell Bagster (1847–1893), Australian politician
- Josiah Bailey (1873–1946), American politician
- Josiah Barber (1771–1842), American politician
- Josiah Bartlett (disambiguation), multiple people
- Josiah Beckwith (1734–1800), English antiquary
- Josiah H. Beeman V (1935–2006), American political figure
- Josiah Begole (1815–1896), American politician
- Josiah Belden (1815–1892), American pioneer
- Josiah Hughes Bell (1791–1838), American pioneer
- Josiah Fisher Bell (1820–1890), American soldier
- Josiah Binnema (born 1997), Canadian swimmer
- Josiah Blackburn (1823–1890), English journalist
- Josiah Bleakley (1754–1822), Canadian fur trader
- Josiah Ofori Boateng (born 1931), Ghanaian judge
- Josiah H. Bonney (1817–1887), American businessman and politician
- Josiah Booth (1852–1929), English composer
- Josiah Boothby (1837–1916), English colonial administrator
- Josiah Boydell (1752–1817), British publisher
- Josiah Brewer (1796–1872), American minister
- Josiah Sandford Brigham (1818–1892), American-Canadian physician and politician
- Josiah Bronson (born 1997), American football player
- Josiah Brown (1816–1875), American civil engineer
- Josiah Bruce (1840–1913), Canadian photographer
- Josiah Bunting III (born 1939), American educator
- Josiah Burchett (1666–1746), British politician
- Josiah Burgess (1689–1719), English pirate
- Josiah Butler (1779–1854), American politician
- Josiah Butterfield (1795–1871), American religious leader

=== C ===
- Josiah Abigail Patterson Campbell (1830–1917), American politician
- Josiah Carter (1813–1868), American politician
- Josiah Champagné (1755–1840), British military commander
- Josiah Chapman (1891–1953), English footballer
- Josiah Child (1630–1699), English merchant
- Josiah Chinamano (1923–1984), Zimbabwean politician
- Josiah Clark (1814–1878), American pianist
- Josiah Latimer Clark (1822–1898), English engineer
- Josiah Clerk (1639–1714), English physician
- Josiah Chorley (1652–1719), English minister
- Josiah Clowes (1735–1794), English civil engineer
- Josiah Coatney (born 1996), American football player
- Josiah Coffin (1804–1887), Canadian politician
- Josiah D. Coleman (born 1972), American judge
- Josiah Collins (disambiguation), multiple people
- Josiah Henry Combs (1832–1894), American lawyer
- Josiah Conder (disambiguation), multiple people
- Josiah Parsons Cooke (1827–1894), American scientist
- Josiah Cottin (1771–1843), English army officer
- Josiah Cotton (1679/1680–1756), English missionary
- Josiah Coulthurst (1893–1970), English cricketer
- Josiah Court (1841–1938), English physician
- Josiah Crosby (diplomat) (1880–1958), British diplomat
- Josiah Crudup (1791–1872), American politician
- Josiah Crump (1828–1890), American clerk
- Josiah M. Curtis (1844–1875), American soldier

=== D ===
- Josiah Dean (1748–1818), American politician
- Josiah Deguara (born 1997), American football player
- Josiah Dent (1817–1899), American politician
- Josiah Didier (born 1993), American ice hockey player
- Josiah Diston (1667–1737), English banker
- Josiah Eustace Dodd (1865–1952), Australian pipe organ builder
- Josiah Dallas Dort (1861–1925), American industrialist
- Josiah Hayden Drummond (1827–1902), American attorney
- Josiah E. DuBois Jr. (1912–1983), American attorney
- Josiah Dunham (1769–1844), American politician
- Josiah Dwight (1671–1748), English minister

=== E ===
- Josiah Griffin Ely (1829–1886), American physician
- Josiah Emery (1731/1732–1794), English watch maker
- Josiah Evans (disambiguation), multiple people
- Josiah T. Everest (1800–1873), American politician
- Josiah Ezirim (born 2001), American football player

=== F ===
- Josiah Failing (1806–1877), American politician
- Josiah Firth (1826–1897), New Zealand farmer
- Josiah Fisher, American judge
- Josiah S. Fisher, American politician
- Josiah Fisk (1781–1844), American politician
- Josiah Flynt (1869–1907), American sociologist
- Josiah Forshall (1795–1863), English librarian
- Josiah Forster (1782–1870), English teacher
- Josiah Fox (1763–1847), British naval architect
- Josiah Francis (disambiguation), multiple people
- Josiah Franklin (1657–1745), English businessman
- Josiah Frederick Fraser (1870–1942), Canadian businessman
- Josiah Freeman, American photographer
- Josiah B. French (1799–1876), American banker

=== G ===
- Josiah Willard Gibbs (1839–1903), American physicist
- Josiah Willard Gibbs Sr. (1790–1861), American theologian
- Josiah Given (1828–1908), American judge
- Josiah Gondo (??–1972), Zimbabwean politician
- Josiah Gorgas (1818–1883), American general
- Josiah Gregg (1806–1850), American merchant
- Josiah Bushnell Grinnell (1821–1891), American politician
- Josiah Grout (1841–1925), American lawyer and politician
- Josiah Gumede (disambiguation), multiple people

=== H ===
- Josiah Hanan (1868–1954), New Zealand politician
- Josiah D. Hank Jr. (1875–1924), American attorney and politician
- Josiah Hardy (1715–1790), British colonial administrator
- Josiah Harlan (1799–1871), American adventurer
- Josiah Harmar (1753-1813), American army officer
- Josiah A. Harris (1808–1876), American politician
- Josiah Hasbrouck (1755–1821), American politician
- Josiah Johnson Hawes (1808–1901), American photographer
- Josiah J. Hazen (1871–1948), American football player
- Josiah Marshall Heath (??–1581), English metallurgist
- Josiah Henson (1789–1883), American author
- Josiah Henson (wrestler) (1922–2012), American wrestler
- Josiah Heyman (born 1958), American anthropologist
- Josiah Duane Hicks (1844–1923), American politician
- Josiah Ogden Hoffman (1766–1837), American lawyer and politician
- Josiah Gilbert Holland (1819–1881), American novelist
- Josiah Hooper (1807–1878), Canadian merchant
- Josiah Hornblower (1729–1809), English engineer
- Josiah Hort (1674–1751), English clergyman
- Josiah Hort, 2nd Baronet (1791–1876), Irish politician
- Josiah Andrew Hudleston (1799–1865), English-Irish civil servant
- Josiah Charles Hughes (1843–1886), Canadian politician

=== I ===
- Josiah Idowu-Fearon (born 1949), Nigerian bishop

=== J ===
- Josiah-Jordan James (born 2000), American basketball forward
- Josiah Jamison (born 1982), American sprinter
- Josiah Johnson (born 1939), Liberian footballer
- Josiah S. Johnston (1784–1833), American politician
- Josiah Judah (born 1978), American boxer

=== K ===
- Josiah Kantiyok (born 1968), Nigerian tribal leader
- Josiah Mwangi Kariuki (1929–1975), Kenyan politician
- Josiah Kelsall (1892–1974), English footballer
- Josiah Kerr (1861–1920), American politician
- Josiah Kibira, Tanzanian filmmaker

=== L ===
- Josiah Lamborn (1809–1847), American politician
- Josiah Lau (born 1940), Hong Kong teacher
- Josiah Leavitt (1744–1804), American physician
- Josiah Leming (born 1989), American singer-songwriter
- Josiah K. Lilly Jr. (1893–1966), American businessman
- Josiah K. Lilly Sr. (1861–1948), American industrialist
- Josiah Litch (1809–1886), American preacher
- Josiah S. Little (1801–1862), American politician
- Josiah O. Livingston (1837–1917), American army officer
- Josiah Lincoln Lowe (1905–1997), American mycologist

=== M ===
- Josiah Macy Jr. (1837–1876), American sea captain
- Josiah H. MacQuarrie (1897–1971), Canadian judge
- Josiah Maduabuchi (born 1988), Nigerian footballer
- Josiah Magnuson (born 1991), American politician
- Josiah Majekodunmi (1927–1996), Nigerian athlete
- Josiah Martin (1737–1786), English colonist
- Josiah Martin (teacher) (1843–1916), New Zealand teacher
- Josiah Marvel Jr. (1904–1955), American diplomat
- Josiah Mason (1795–1881), English industrialist
- Josiah Masters (1763–1822), American politician
- Josiah McCracken (1874–1962), American football player
- Josiah McElheny (born 1966), American artist
- Josiah Meigs (1757–1822), American academic
- Josiah Middaugh (born 1978), American triathlete
- Josiah Miller (1832–1890), English minister
- Josiah Mills (1862–1929), English cricketer
- Josiah Lewis Morgan (1893–1982), Welsh pilot

=== N ===
- Josiah T. Newcomb (1868–1944), American lawyer and politician
- Josiah Ng (born 1980), Malaysian cyclist
- Josiah C. Nott (1804–1873), American surgeon

=== O ===
- Josiah Ober, American professor
- Josiah Oldfield (1863–1953), English lawyer
- Josiah Owen (1711?–1755), Welsh Presbyterian minister
- Josiah Owen (1984- Present ), American Professional Bike Courier

=== P ===
- Josiah Pardo (1626–1684), Dutch rabbi
- Josiah Parker (1751–1810), American politician
- Josiah Parkes (1793–1791), English civil engineer
- Josiah Lamberson Parrish (1806–1895), American missionary
- Josiah Partridge (1805–1897), Australian lawyer
- Josiah Patkotak (born 1994), American politician
- Josiah Patterson (1837–1904), American soldier
- Josiah Edward Paul (1853–??), English rugby union footballer
- Josiah Williams Pearce (1850–1938), Canadian merchant
- Josiah Pearson (1841–1895), Australian bishop
- Josiah Pender (1819–1864), American soldier
- Josiah Phillips (1830–1894), American soldier
- Josiah Little Pickard (1824–1914), American academic administrator
- Josiah Pierce (1792–1866), American politician
- Josiah ben Joseph Pinto (1565–1648), Syrian rabbi
- Josiah Pittman (1816–1886), British organist
- Josiah Pleydell (1641–1707), English priest
- Josiah Burr Plumb (1816–1888), American-Canadian businessman
- Josiah Pratt (1768–1844), English clergyman
- Josiah Preston (1885–??), English footballer
- Josiah Johnston Preston (1855–1937), Canadian politician
- Josiah Priest (1788–1861), American writer

=== Q ===
- Josiah Quincy (disambiguation), multiple people

=== R ===
- Josiah Ramel (c.2020s), known professionally as Lithe, Australian rapper, singer, songwriter, and record producer
- Josiah Ransome-Kuti (1855–1930), Nigerian clergyman
- Josiah Rees (1744–1804), Welsh minister
- Josiah Rees (judge) (1821–1899), Bermudian judge
- Josiah Royce (1855–1916), American philosopher
- Josiah Russell (1844–1911), English businessman

=== S ===
- Josiah Scott (disambiguation), multiple people
- Josiah Seton (born 1979), Liberian footballer
- Josiah T. Settle (1850–1915), American lawyer
- Josiah Sherman, American politician
- Josiah Sleeper (??–1946), American businessman
- Josiah Smith (disambiguation), multiple people
- Josiah Snelgrove (born 1986), Canadian soccer player
- Josiah Snelling (1782–1828), American military officer
- Josiah Sowande (1858–1936), Nigerian poet
- Josiah Spaulding (1922–1983), American businessman
- Josiah Spode (1733–1797), English potter
- Josiah Edward Spurr (1870–1950), American geologist
- Josiah Stamp (1880–1941), British civil servant
- Josiah Standish (1633–1690), English colonist
- Josiah Steinbrick (born 1981), American instrumentalist
- Josaiah Stewart (born 2003), American football player
- Josiah St. John (born 1992), Canadian football player
- Josiah Strong (1847–1916), American clergyman
- Josiah Sutherland (1804–1887), American lawyer and politician
- Josiah Symon (1846–1934), Scottish-Australian lawyer and politician

=== T ===
- Josiah Taft (1709–1756), American soldier
- Josiah Tattnall (disambiguation), multiple people
- Josiah Tauaefa (born 1997), American football player
- Josiah Thomas (disambiguation), multiple people
- Josiah Thompson (born 1935), American writer
- Josiah Tongogara (1938–1979), Zimbabwean military officer
- Josiah Charles Trent (1914–1948), American surgeon
- Josiah Trimmingham (born 1996), Trinidadian politician
- Josiah Trotter (born 2005), American football player
- Josiah Trowbridge (1785–1862), American politician
- Josiah Tuck (1824–1900), American inventor
- Josiah Tucker (1713–1799), Welsh clergyman
- Josiah Tungamirai (1948–2005), Zimbabwean military officer
- Josiah Turner (1821–1901), American lawyer and politician
- Josiah Turner (judge) (1811–1907), American judge
- Josiah Twum-Boafo (born 1997), South African rugby union footballer

=== V ===
- Josiah Alexander Van Orsdel (1860–1937), American judge
- Josiah Vavasseur (1834–1908), English industrialist

=== W ===
- Josiah T. Walls (1842–1905), American politician
- Josiah Warren (1798–1874), American anarchist
- Josiah Ogden Watson (1784–1852), American politician
- Josiah Wedgwood (disambiguation), multiple people
- Josiah White (1781–1850), American industrialist
- Josiah Whitney (1819–1896), American geologist
- Josiah P. Wilbarger (1801–1845), American settler
- Josiah Willard (1805–1868), American farmer
- Josiah B. Williams (1810–1883), American businessman
- Josiah Winslow (1628–1680), English politician
- Josiah O. Wolcott (1877–1938), American lawyer and politician
- Josiah Wolf, American drummer
- Josiah Wood (1843–1927), Canadian lawyer
- Josiah Woodward (1657–1712), English clergyman

=== Y ===
- Josiah Yazdani (born 1991), American football player
- Josiah T. Young (1831–1907), American editor and politician

=== Z ===
- Josiah Zayner (born 1981), American bioengineer
- Josiah Zuro (1887–1930), Polish-American pianist

== Fictional characters ==
- Josiah Bartlet, US President in the television series The West Wing
- Josiah S. Carberry, fictional professor at Brown University
- Josiah Power, DC Comics superhero
- Josiah X, super-soldier in the Marvel Comics Universe
- Josiah Trelawny, conman in the video game Red Dead Redemption 2
