= History of watches =

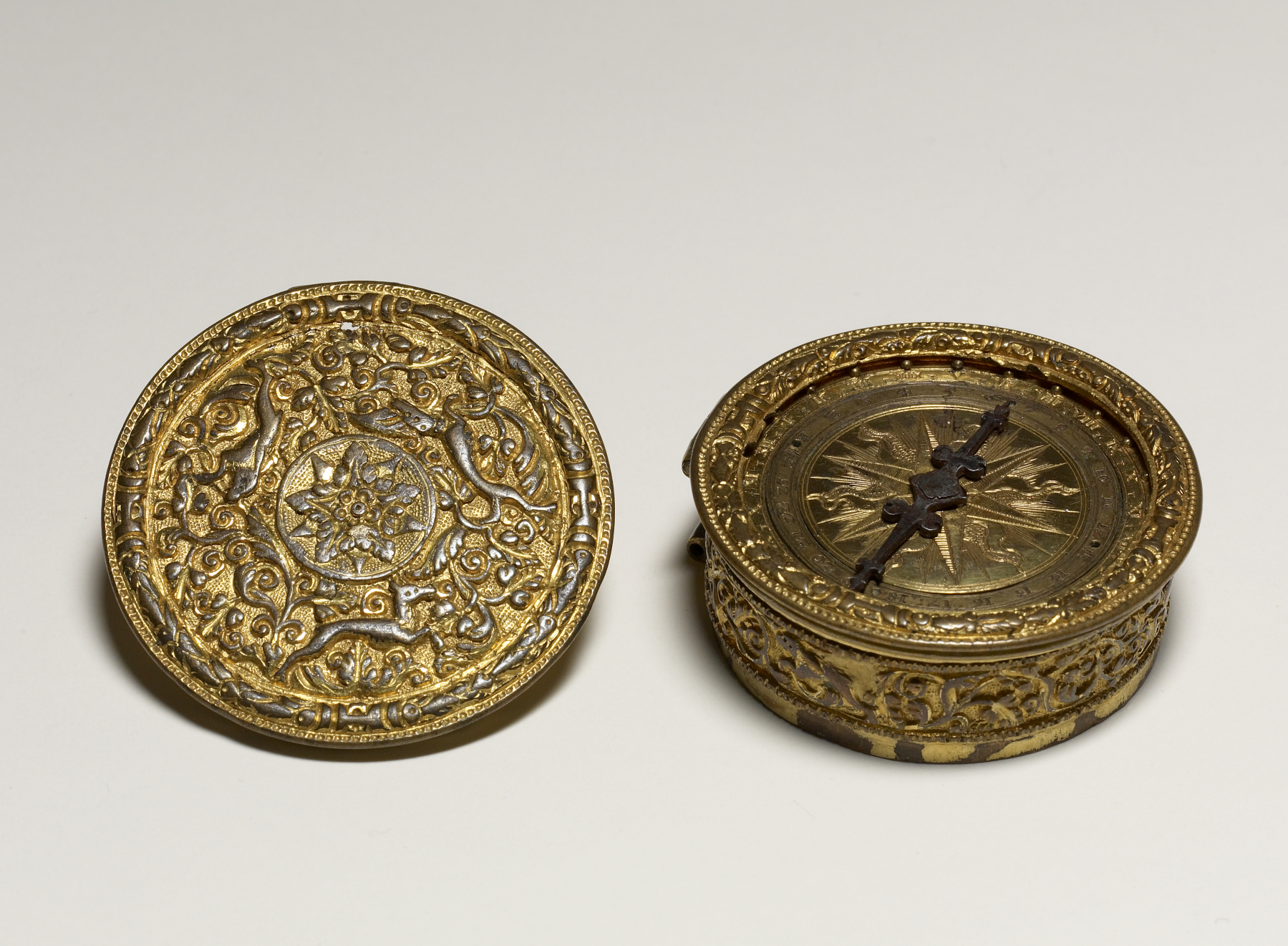
A 16th-century portable drum watch with sundial. The 24-hour dial has Roman numerals on the outer band and Hindu–Arabic numerals on the inner one.

The history of watches began in 16th-century Europe, where watches evolved from portable spring-driven clocks, which first appeared in the 15th century.

The watch was developed by inventors and engineers from the 16th century to the mid-20th century as a mechanical device, powered by winding a mainspring which turned gears and then moved the hands; it kept time with a rotating balance wheel. In the 1960s the invention of the quartz watch which ran on electricity and kept time with a vibrating quartz crystal, proved a radical departure for the watchmaking industry. During the 1980s quartz watches took over the market from mechanical watches, a process referred to as the "quartz crisis". Although mechanical watches still sell in the watch market, the vast majority of watches as of 2020 have quartz movements.

One account of the origin of the word "watch" suggests that it came from the Old English word woecce which meant "watchman", because town watchmen used watches to keep track of their shifts. Another theory surmises that the term came from 17th-century sailors, who used the new mechanisms to time the length of their shipboard watches (duty shifts).

The Oxford English Dictionary records the word watch in association with a timepiece from at least as early as 1542.

== Clock-watch ==
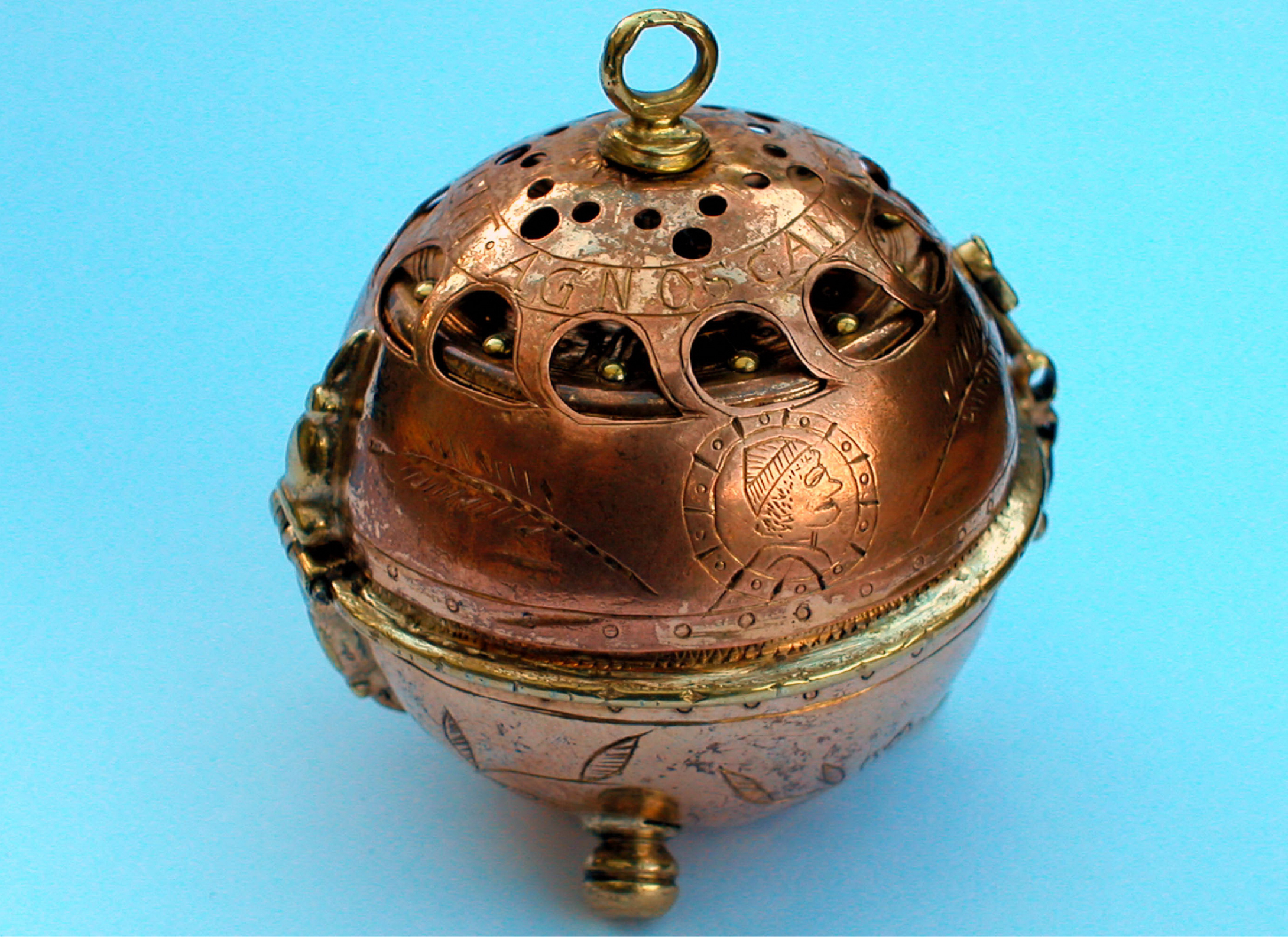
An early watch from around 1505 purportedly by Peter Henlein

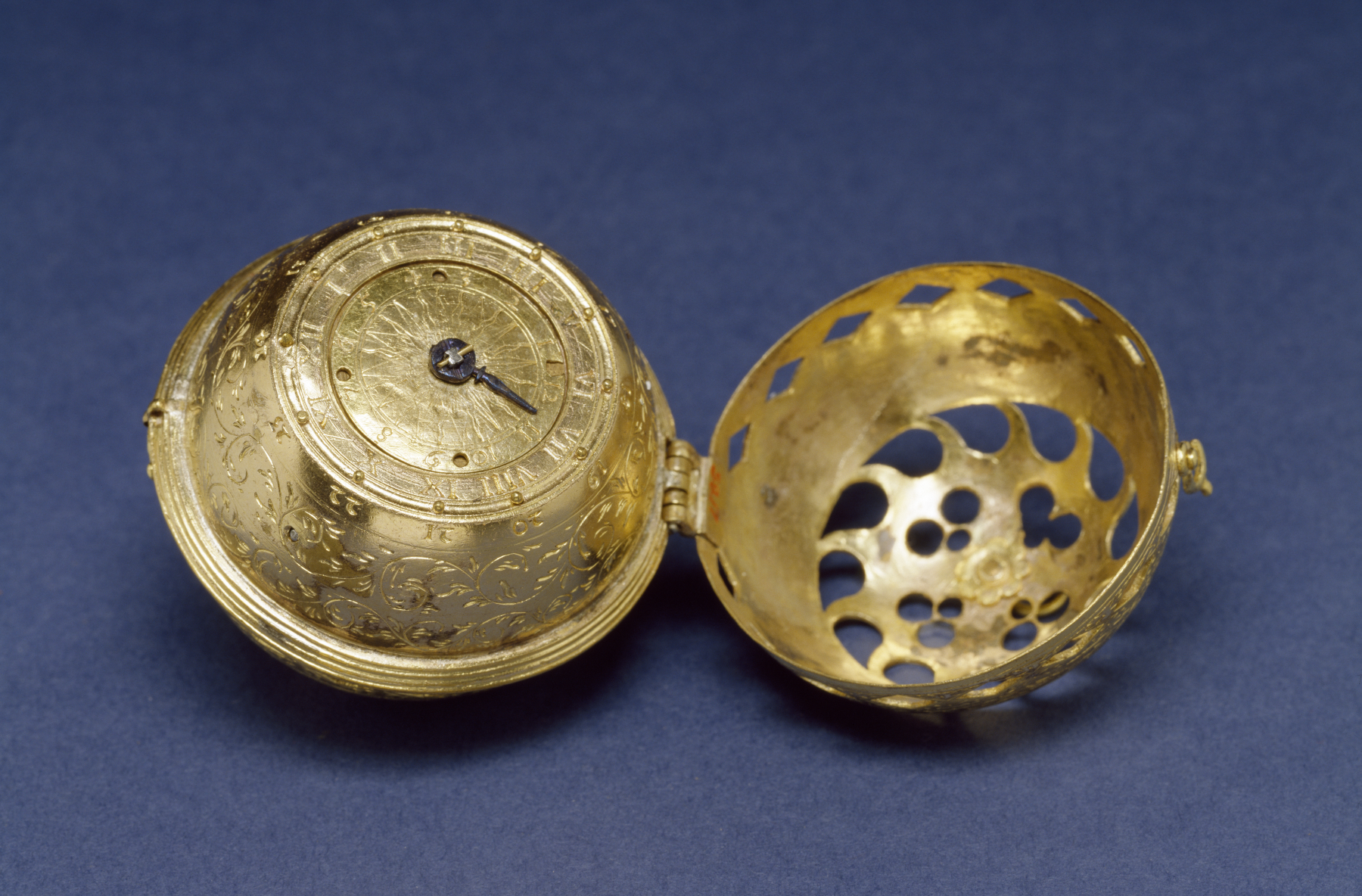
A pomander watch from 1530 once belonged to Philip Melanchthon and is now in the Walters Art Museum, Baltimore.

The first timepieces to be worn, made in the 16th century beginning in the German cities of Nuremberg and Augsburg, were transitional in size between clocks and watches. Portable timepieces were made possible by the invention of the mainspring in the early 15th century. Nuremberg clockmaker Peter Henlein (or Henle or Hele) (1485-1542) is often credited as the inventor of the watch. He was one of the first German craftsmen who made "clock-watches", ornamental timepieces worn as pendants, which were the first timepieces to be worn on the body. His fame is based on a passage by Johann Cochläus in 1511,

Peter Hele, still a young man, fashions works which even the most learned mathematicians admire. He shapes many-wheeled clocks out of small bits of iron, which run and chime the hours without weights for forty hours, whether carried at the breast or in a handbag

However, other German clockmakers were creating miniature timepieces during this period, and there is no evidence Henlein was the first.

These 'clock-watches' were fastened to clothing or worn on a chain around the neck. They were heavy drum-shaped cylindrical brass boxes several inches in diameter, engraved and ornamented. They had only an hour hand. The face was not covered with glass, but usually had a hinged brass cover, often decoratively pierced with grillwork so the time could be read without opening. The movement was made of iron or steel and held together with tapered pins and wedges, until screws began to be used after 1550. Many of the movements included striking or alarm mechanisms. They usually had to be wound twice a day. The shape later evolved into a rounded form; these were later called Nuremberg eggs. Still later in the century there was a trend for unusually shaped watches, and clock-watches shaped like books, animals, fruit, stars, flowers, insects, crosses, and even skulls (Death's head watches) were made.

These early clock-watches were not worn to tell the time. The accuracy of their verge and foliot movements was so poor, with errors of perhaps several hours per day, that they were practically useless. They were made as jewelry and novelties for the nobility, valued for their fine ornamentation, unusual shape, or intriguing mechanism, and accurate timekeeping was of very minor importance.

== Pocket watch ==
Styles changed in the 17th century and men began to wear watches in pockets instead of as pendants (the woman's watch remained a pendant into the 20th century). This is said to have occurred in 1675 when Charles II of England introduced waistcoats. This was not just a matter of fashion or prejudice; watches of the time were notoriously prone to fouling from exposure to the elements, and could only reliably be kept safe from harm if carried securely in the pocket. To fit in pockets, their shape evolved into the typical pocket watch shape, rounded and flattened with no sharp edges. Glass was used to cover the face beginning around 1610. Watch fobs began to be used, the name originating from the German word fuppe, a pocket. Later in the 1800s Prince Albert, the consort to Queen Victoria, introduced the 'Albert chain' accessory, designed to secure the pocket watch to the man's outergarment by way of a clip. The watch was wound and also set by opening the back and fitting a key to a square arbor, and turning it.

The timekeeping mechanism in these early pocket watches was the same one used in clocks, invented in the 13th century; the verge escapement which drove a foliot, a dumbbell shaped bar with weights on the ends, to oscillate back and forth. However, the mainspring introduced a source of error not present in weight-powered clocks. The force provided by a spring is not constant, but decreases as the spring unwinds. The rate of all timekeeping mechanisms is affected by changes in their drive force, but the primitive verge and foliot mechanism was especially sensitive to these changes, so early watches slowed down during their running period as the mainspring ran down. This problem, called lack of isochronism, plagued mechanical watches throughout their history.

Efforts to improve the accuracy of watches prior to 1657 focused on evening out the steep torque curve of the mainspring. Two devices to do this had appeared in the first clock-watches: the stackfreed and the fusee. The stackfreed, a spring-loaded cam on the mainspring shaft, added a lot of friction and was abandoned after about a century. The fusee was a much more lasting idea. A curving conical pulley with a chain wrapped around it attached to the mainspring barrel, it changed the leverage as the spring unwound, equalizing the drive force. Fusees became standard in all watches, and were used until the early 19th century. The foliot was also gradually replaced with the balance wheel, which had a higher moment of inertia for its size, allowing better timekeeping.

== Balance spring ==
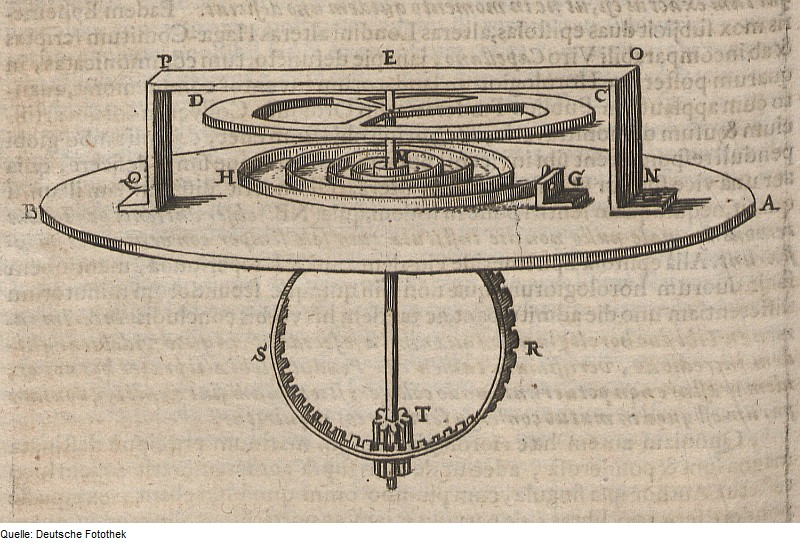
Drawing of one of his first balance springs, attached to a balance wheel, by Christiaan Huygens, published in his letter in the Journal des Sçavants of 25 February 1675

A great leap forward in accuracy occurred in 1657 with the addition of the balance spring to the balance wheel, an invention disputed both at the time and ever since between Robert Hooke and Christiaan Huygens. Prior to this, the only force limiting the back and forth motion of the balance wheel under the force of the escapement was the wheel's inertia. This caused the wheel's period to be very sensitive to the force of the mainspring. The balance spring made the balance wheel a harmonic oscillator, with a natural 'beat' resistant to disturbances. This increased watches' accuracy enormously, reducing error from perhaps several hours per day to perhaps 10 minutes per day, resulting in the addition of the minute hand to the face from around 1680 in Britain and 1700 in France. The increased accuracy of the balance wheel focused attention on errors caused by other parts of the movement, igniting a two century wave of watchmaking innovation.

The first thing to be improved was the escapement. The verge escapement was replaced in quality watches by the cylinder escapement, invented by Thomas Tompion in 1695 and further developed by George Graham in 1715. In Britain a few quality watches went to the duplex escapement, invented by Jean Baptiste Dutertre in 1724. The advantage of these escapements was that they only gave the balance wheel a short push in the middle of its swing, leaving it 'detached' from the escapement to swing back and forth undisturbed during most of its cycle.

During the same period, improvements in manufacturing such as the tooth-cutting machine devised by Robert Hooke allowed some increase in the volume of watch production, although finishing and assembling was still done by hand until well into the 19th century.

== Temperature compensation and chronometers ==
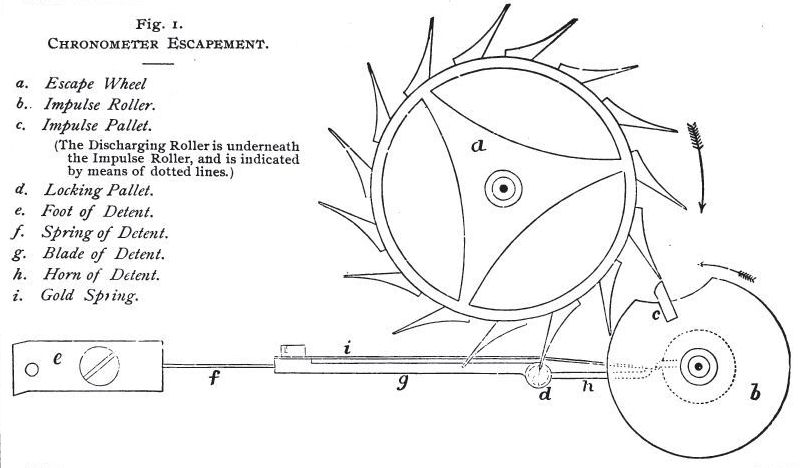
Diagram of Thomas Earnshaw's standard chronometer detent escapement

The Enlightenment view of watches as scientific instruments brought rapid advances to their mechanisms. The development during this period of accurate marine chronometers required in celestial navigation to determine longitude during sea voyages produced many technological advances that were later used in watches. It was found that a major cause of error in balance wheel timepieces was changes in elasticity of the balance spring with temperature changes. This problem was solved by the bimetallic temperature compensated balance wheel invented in 1765 by Pierre Le Roy and improved by Thomas Earnshaw. This type of balance wheel had two semicircular arms made of a bimetallic construction. If the temperature rose, the arms bent inward slightly, causing the balance wheel to rotate faster back and forth, compensating for the slowing due to the weaker balance spring. This system, which could reduce temperature induced error to a few seconds per day, gradually began to be used in watches over the next hundred years.

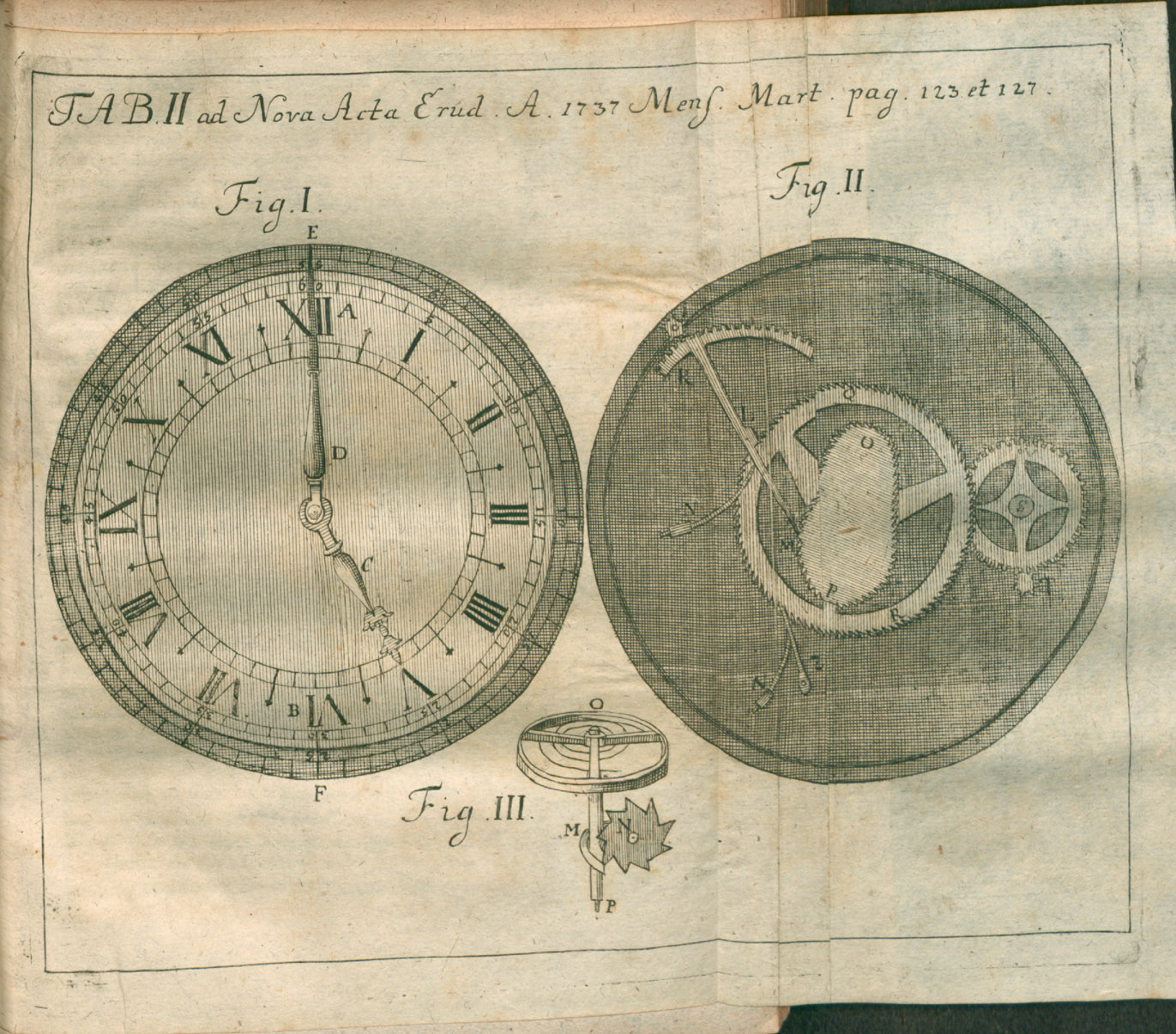
A watch from an illustration published in Acta Eruditorum, 1737

The going barrel invented in 1760 by Jean-Antoine Lépine provided a more constant drive force over the watch's running period, and its adoption in the 19th century made the fusee obsolete. Complicated pocket chronometers and astronomical watches with many hands and functions were made during this period.

== Lever escapement ==
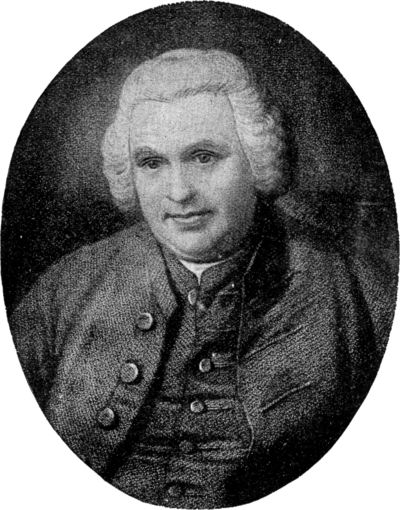
Thomas Mudge, inventor of the lever escapement

The lever escapement, invented by Thomas Mudge in 1754 and improved by Josiah Emery in 1785, gradually came into use from about 1800 onwards, chiefly in Britain; it was also adopted by Abraham-Louis Breguet, but Swiss watchmakers (who by now were the chief suppliers of watches to most of Europe) mostly adhered to the cylinder until the 1860s. By about 1900, however, the lever was used in almost every watch made. In this escapement the escape wheel pushed on a T-shaped 'lever', which was unlocked as the balance wheel swung through its centre position and gave the wheel a brief push before releasing it. The advantages of the lever was that it allowed the balance wheel to swing completely free during most of its cycle; due to 'locking' and 'draw' its action was very precise; and it was self-starting, so if the balance wheel was stopped by a jar it would start again.

Jewel bearings, introduced in England in 1702 by the Swiss mathematician Nicolas Fatio de Duillier, also came into use for quality watches during this period. Watches of this period are characterised by their thinness. New innovations, such as the cylinder and lever escapements, allowed watches to become much thinner than they had previously been. This caused a change in style. The thick pocketwatches based on the verge movement went out of fashion and were only worn by the poor, and were derisively referred to as "onions" and "turnips".

== Mass production ==
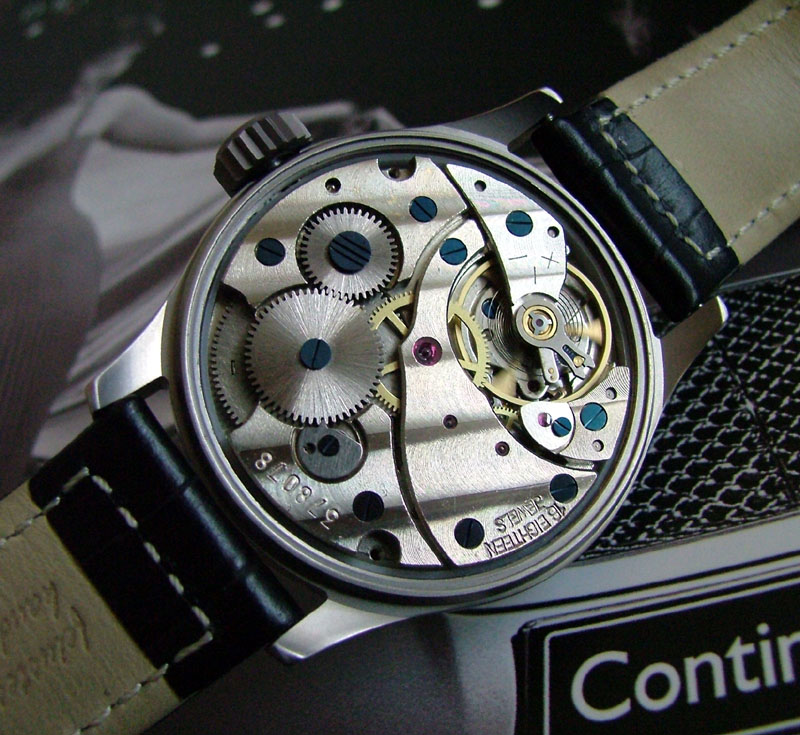
A mechanical watch movement

At Vacheron Constantin, Geneva, Georges-Auguste Leschot (1800–1884), pioneered the field of interchangeability in clockmaking by the invention of various machine tools. In 1830 he designed an anchor escapement, which his student, Antoine Léchaud, later mass-produced. He also invented a pantograph, allowing some degree of standardisation and interchangeability of parts on watches fitted with the same calibre.

The British had predominated in watch manufacture for much of the 17th and 18th centuries, but maintained a system of production that was geared towards high quality products for the elite. Although there was an attempt to modernise clock manufacture with mass production techniques and the application of duplicating tools and machinery by the British Watch Company in 1843, it was in the United States that this system took off. Aaron Lufkin Dennison started a factory in 1851 in Massachusetts that used interchangeable parts, and by 1861 was running a successful enterprise incorporated as the Waltham Watch Company.

The railroads' stringent requirements for accurate watches to safely schedule trains drove improvements in accuracy. The engineer Webb C. Ball, established around 1891 the first precision standards and a reliable timepiece inspection system for Railroad chronometers. Temperature-compensated balance wheels began to be widely used in watches during this period, and jewel bearings became almost universal. Techniques for adjusting the balance spring for isochronism and positional errors discovered by Abraham-Louis Breguet, M. Phillips, and L. Lossier were adopted. The first international watch precision contest took place in 1876, during the International Centennial Exposition in Philadelphia (the winning four top watches, which outclassed all competitors, had been randomly selected out of the mass production line), on display was also the first fully automatic screw-making machine. By 1900, with these advances, the accuracy of quality watches, properly adjusted, topped out at a few seconds per day.

The American clock industry, with scores of companies located in Connecticut's Naugatuck Valley, was producing millions of clocks, earning the region the nickname, "Switzerland of America". The Waterbury Clock Company was one of the largest producers for both domestic sales and export, primarily to Europe. Today its successor, Timex Group USA, Inc. is the only remaining watch company in the region.

From about 1860, key winding was replaced by keyless winding, where the watch was wound by turning the crown. The pin pallet escapement, an inexpensive version of the lever escapement invented in 1876 by Georges Frederic Roskopf was used in cheap mass-produced watches, which allowed ordinary workers to own a watch for the first time; other cheap watches used a simplified version of the duplex escapement, developed by Daniel Buck in the 1870s.

During the 20th century, the mechanical design of the watch became standardized, and advances were made in materials, tolerances, and production methods. The bimetallic temperature-compensated balance wheel was made obsolete by the discovery of low-thermal-coefficient alloys invar and elinvar. A balance wheel of invar with a spring of elinvar was almost unaffected by temperature changes, so it replaced the complicated temperature-compensated balance. The discovery in 1903 of a process to produce artificial sapphire made jewelling cheap. Bridge construction superseded 3/4 plate construction.

== Wristwatch ==
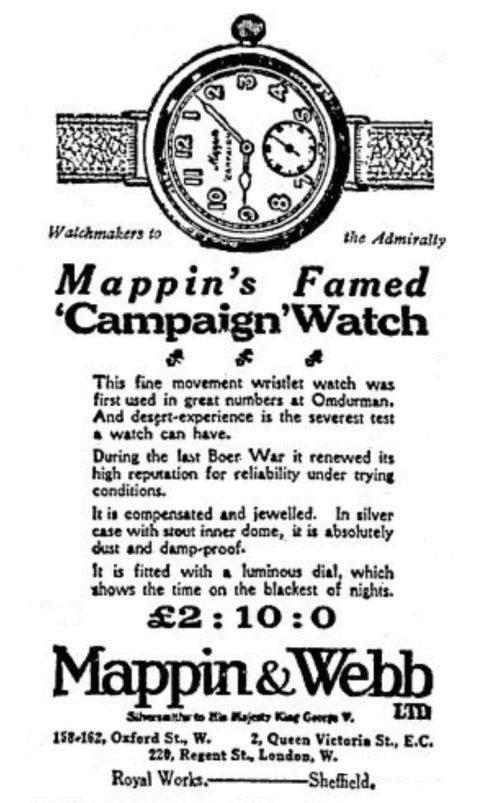
Mappin & Webb's wristwatch (1898)

From the beginning, wristwatches were almost exclusively worn by women, while men used pocket watches up until the early 20th century. The concept of the wristwatch goes back to the production of the very earliest watches in the 16th century. Some people say the world's first wristwatch was created by Abraham-Louis Breguet for Caroline Murat, Queen of Naples, in 1810. By the mid nineteenth century, most watchmakers produced a range of wristwatches, often marketed as bracelets, for women.

Founded in 1832, Longines was the world's first watch trademark and the first Swiss company to assemble watches under one roof.

Wristwatches were first worn by military men towards the end of the nineteenth century, when the importance of synchronizing maneuvers during war without potentially revealing the plan to the enemy through signaling was increasingly recognized. It was clear that using pocket watches while in the heat of battle or while mounted on a horse was impractical, so officers began to strap the watches to their wrist. The Garstin Company of London patented a 'Watch Wristlet' design in 1893, although they were probably producing similar designs from the 1880s. Officers in the British Army began using wristwatches during colonial military campaigns in the 1880s, such as during the Anglo-Burma War of 1885.

During the Boer War, the importance of coordinating troop movements and synchronizing attacks against the highly mobile Boer insurgents was paramount, and the use of wristwatches subsequently became widespread among the officer class. The company Mappin & Webb began production of their successful 'campaign watch' for soldiers during the campaign at the Sudan in 1898 and ramped up production for the Boer War a few years later.

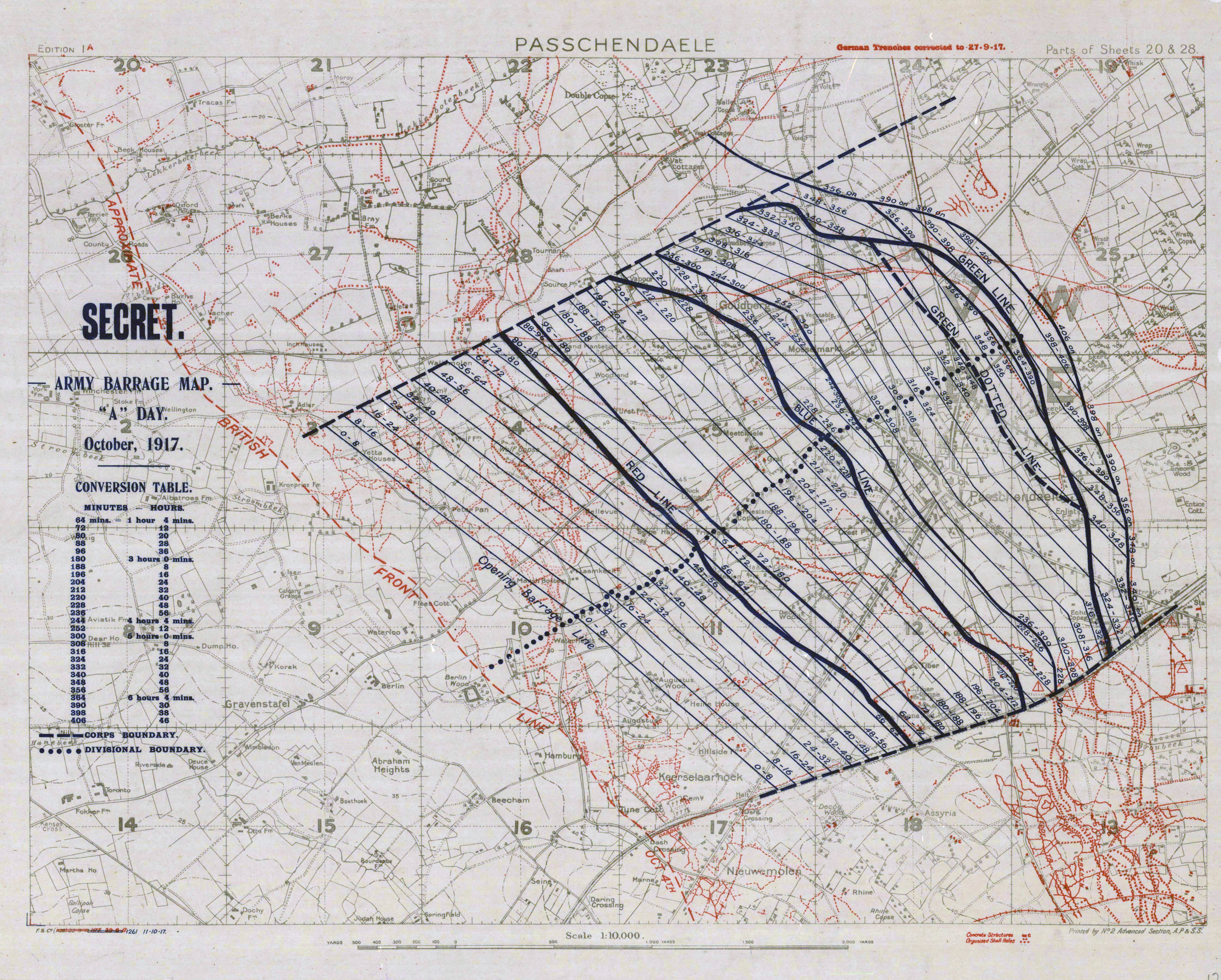
Planning map for an Allied creeping barrage at Passchendaele a tactic that required precise synchronisation between the artillery and infantry

These early models were essentially standard pocketwatches fitted to a leather strap, but by the early 20th century, manufacturers began producing purpose-built wristwatches. The Swiss company, Dimier Frères & Cie patented a wristwatch design with the now standard wire lugs in 1903. In 1904, Alberto Santos-Dumont, an early Brazilian aviator, asked his friend, a French watchmaker called Louis Cartier, to design a watch that could be useful during his flights. Hans Wilsdorf moved to London in 1905 and set up his own business with his brother-in-law Alfred Davis, Wilsdorf & Davis, providing quality timepieces at affordable prices – the company later became Rolex. Wilsdorf was an early convert to the wristwatch, and contracted the Swiss firm Aegler to produce a line of wristwatches. His Rolex wristwatch of 1910 became the first such watch to receive certification as a chronometer in Switzerland and it went on to win an award in 1914 from Kew Observatory in London.

The impact of the First World War dramatically shifted public perceptions on the propriety of the man's wristwatch, and opened up a mass market in the post-war era. The creeping barrage artillery tactic, developed during the War, required precise synchronization between the artillery gunners and the infantry advancing behind the barrage. Service watches produced during the War were specially designed for the rigours of trench warfare, with luminous dials and unbreakable glass. Wristwatches were also found to be needed in the air as much as on the ground: military pilots found them more convenient than pocket watches for the same reasons as Santos-Dumont had. The British War Department began issuing wristwatches to combatants from 1917.

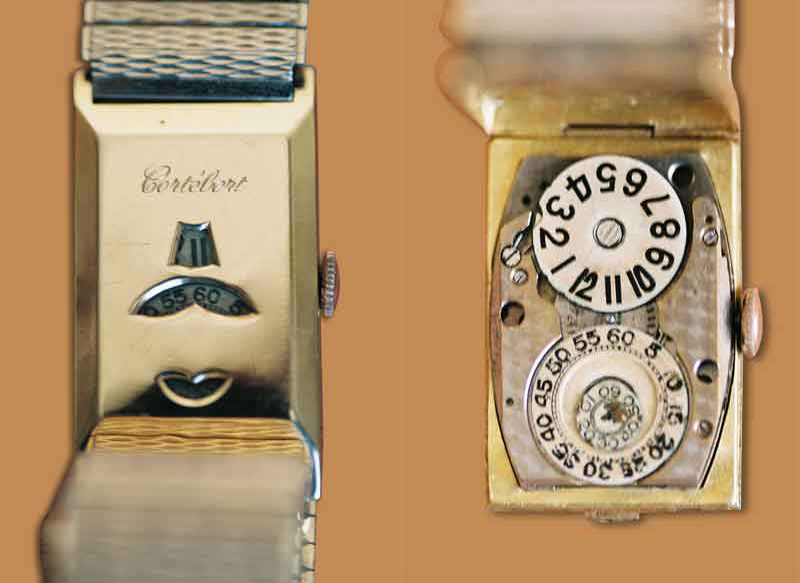
A Cortébert wristwatch (1920s)

The company H. Williamson Ltd., based in Coventry, was one of the first to capitalize on this opportunity. During the company's 1916 AGM it was noted that "...the public is buying the practical things of life. Nobody can truthfully contend that the watch is a luxury. It is said that one soldier in every four wears a wristlet watch, and the other three mean to get one as soon as they can." By the end of the War, almost all enlisted men wore a wristwatch, and after they were demobilized, the fashion soon caught on – the British Horological Journal wrote in 1917 that "...the wristlet watch was little used by the sterner sex before the war, but now is seen on the wrist of nearly every man in uniform and of many men in civilian attire." By 1930, the ratio of wrist- to pocketwatches was 50 to 1. The first successful self-winding system was invented by John Harwood in 1923.

In 1961, the first wristwatch traveled to space on the wrist of Yuri Gagarin on Vostok 1.

== Electric watch ==
The first generation of electric-powered watches came out during the 1950s. These kept time with a balance wheel powered by a solenoid, or in a few advanced watches that foreshadowed the quartz watch, by a steel tuning fork vibrating at 360 Hz, powered by a solenoid driven by a transistor oscillator circuit. The hands were still moved mechanically by a wheel train. In mechanical watches the self winding mechanism, shockproof balance pivots, and break resistant 'white metal' mainsprings became standard. The jewel craze caused 'jewel inflation' and watches with up to 100 jewels were produced.

== Quartz watch ==
In 1959, Seiko placed an order with Epson (a daughter company of Seiko and the 'brain' behind the quartz revolution) to start developing a quartz wristwatch. The project was codenamed 59A. By the 1964 Tokyo Summer Olympics, Seiko had a working prototype of a portable quartz watch which was used as the time measurements throughout the event.

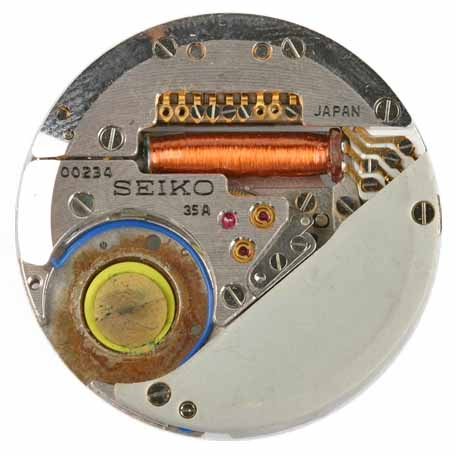
Quartz Movement of the Seiko Astron (1969)

The first quartz watch to enter production was the Seiko 35 SQ Astron, which hit the shelves on 25 December 1969, which was the world's most accurate wristwatch to date. Since the technology having been developed by contributions from Japanese, American and Swiss, nobody could patent the whole movement of the quartz wristwatch, thus allowing other manufacturers to participate in the rapid growth and development of the quartz watch market. This ended — in less than a decade — almost 100 years of dominance by the mechanical wristwatch.

The introduction of the quartz watch in 1969 was a revolutionary improvement in watch technology. In place of a balance wheel which oscillated at 5 beats per second, it used a quartz crystal resonator which vibrated at 8,192 Hz, driven by a battery-powered oscillator circuit. In place of a wheel train to add up the beats into seconds, minutes, and hours, it used digital counters. The higher Q factor of the resonator, along with quartz's low temperature coefficient, resulted in better accuracy than the best mechanical watches, while the elimination of all moving parts made the watch more shock-resistant and eliminated the need for periodic cleaning. The first digital electronic watch with an LED display was developed in 1970 by Pulsar. In 1974 the Omega Marine Chronometer was introduced, the first wrist watch to hold Marine Chronometer certification, and accurate to 12 seconds per year.

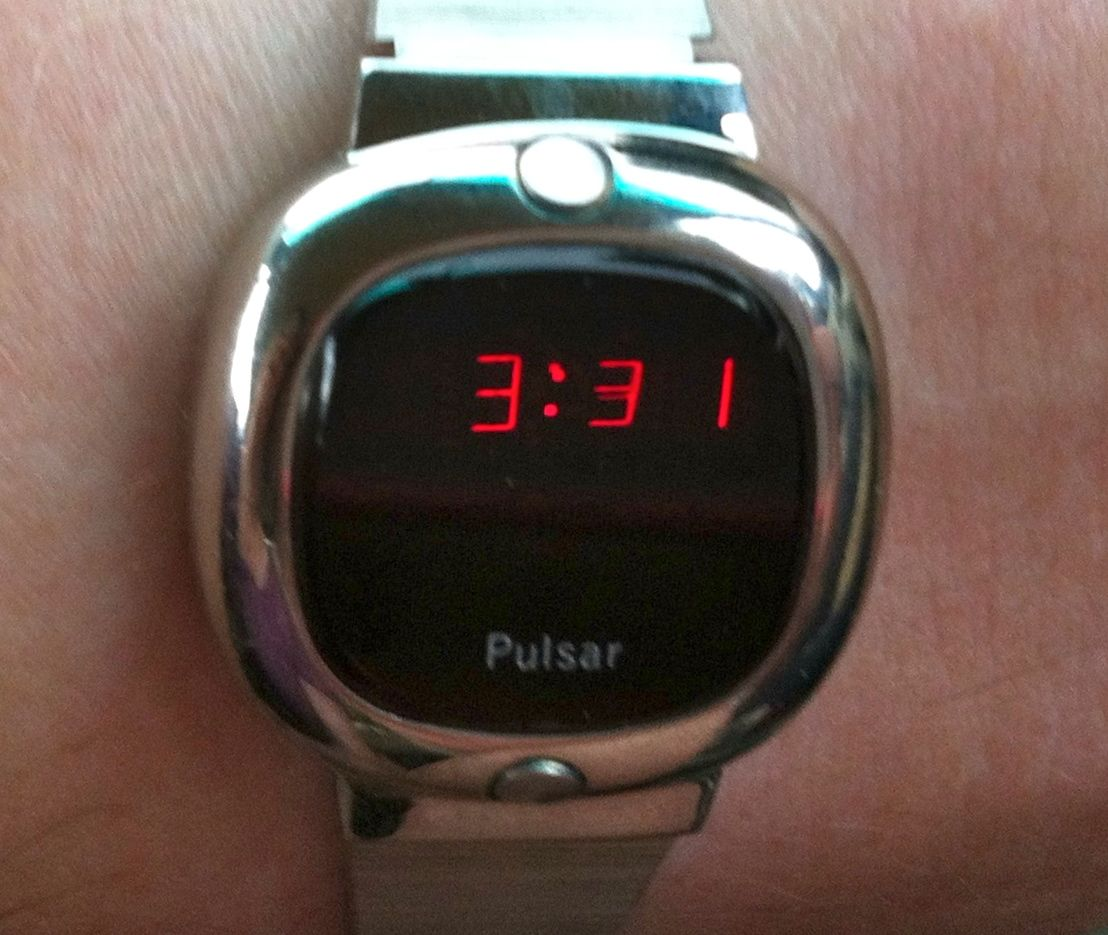
A Pulsar LED quartz watch (1976)

Accuracy increased with the frequency of the crystal used, but so did power consumption. So the first generation watches had low frequencies of a few kilohertz, limiting their accuracy. The power saving use of CMOS logic and LCDs in the second generation increased battery life and allowed the crystal frequency to be increased to 32,768 Hz resulting in accuracy of 5–10 seconds per month. By the 1980s, quartz watches had taken over most of the watch market from the mechanical watch industry. This upheaval, which saw the majority of watch manufacturing move to the Far East, is referred to in the industry as the "quartz crisis".

In 2010, Miyota (Citizen Watch) of Japan introduced a movement based on an expired patent by Seiko that uses a type of quartz crystal with ultra-high frequency (262.144 kHz) which is claimed to be accurate to +/- 10 seconds a year. Some Bulova models featuring the movement have a smooth sweeping second hand rather than one that 'ticks' second-to-second.

In 2019, Citizen Watch advanced the accuracy of a quartz watch to +/- 1 second a year. The improved accuracy was achieved by using an AT-cut crystal which oscillates at 8.4 MHz (8,388,608 Hz). The watch maintains its greater accuracy by continuously monitoring and adjusting for frequency and temperature shifts once every minute.

In 2021, Furlan Marri reintroduced the mecha quartz movement into Swiss watchmacking for which it won the Horological Revelation Prize at the Grand Prix d'Horlogerie de Genève, the first Swiss-based brand to embrace quartz in decades.

== Radio-controlled wristwatch ==
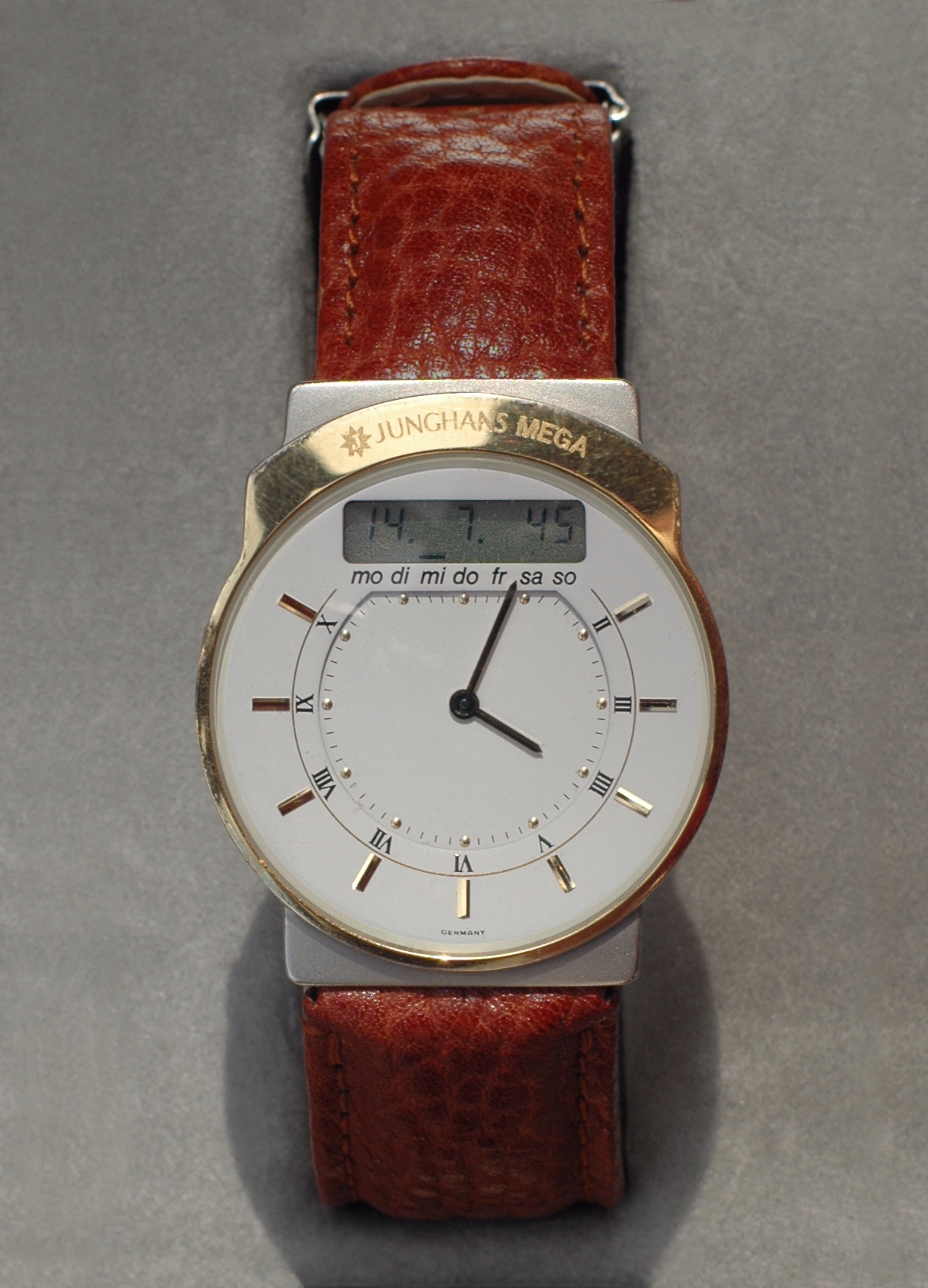
Junghans Mega is the world's first radio-controlled analog wristwatch in 1991.

In 1990, Junghans offered the first radio-controlled wristwatch, the MEGA 1. In this type, the watch's quartz oscillator is set to the correct time daily by coded radio time signals broadcast by government-operated time stations such as JJY, MSF, RBU, DCF77, and WWVB, received by a radio receiver in the watch. This allows the watch to have the same long-term accuracy as the atomic clocks which control the time signals. Recent models are capable of receiving synchronization signals from various time stations worldwide.

== Atomic wristwatch ==
In 2013 Bathys Hawaii introduced their Cesium 133 Atomic Watch the first watch to keep time with an internal atomic clock. Unlike the radio watches described above, which achieve atomic clock accuracy with quartz clock circuits which are corrected by radio time signals received from government atomic clocks, this watch contains a tiny cesium atomic clock on a chip. It is reported to keep time to an accuracy of one second in 1000 years.

The watch is based on a chip developed by the breakthrough Chip Scale Atomic Clock (CSAC) program of the US Defense Advanced Research Projects Agency (DARPA) which was initiated in 2001, and produced the first prototype atomic clock chip in 2005. Symmetricom began manufacturing the chips in 2011. Like other cesium clocks the watch keeps time with an ultraprecise 9.192631770 GHz microwave signal produced by electron transitions between two hyperfine energy levels in atoms of cesium, which is divided down by digital counters to give a 1 Hz clock signal to drive the hands. On the chip, liquid metal cesium in a tiny capsule is heated to vaporize the cesium. A laser shines a beam of infrared light modulated by a microwave oscillator through the capsule onto a photodetector. When the oscillator is at the precise frequency of the transition, the cesium atoms absorb the light, reducing the output of the photodetector. The output of the photodetector is used as feedback in a phase locked loop circuit to keep the oscillator at the correct frequency. The breakthrough that allowed a rack-sized cesium clock to be shrunk small enough to fit on a chip was a technique called coherent population trapping, which eliminated the need for a bulky microwave cavity.

The watch was designed by John Patterson, head of Bathys, who read about the chip and decided to design a watch around it, financed by a Kickstarter campaign. Due to the large 1 1/2-inch chip, the watch is large and rectangular. It must be recharged every 30 hours.

== Smartwatch ==
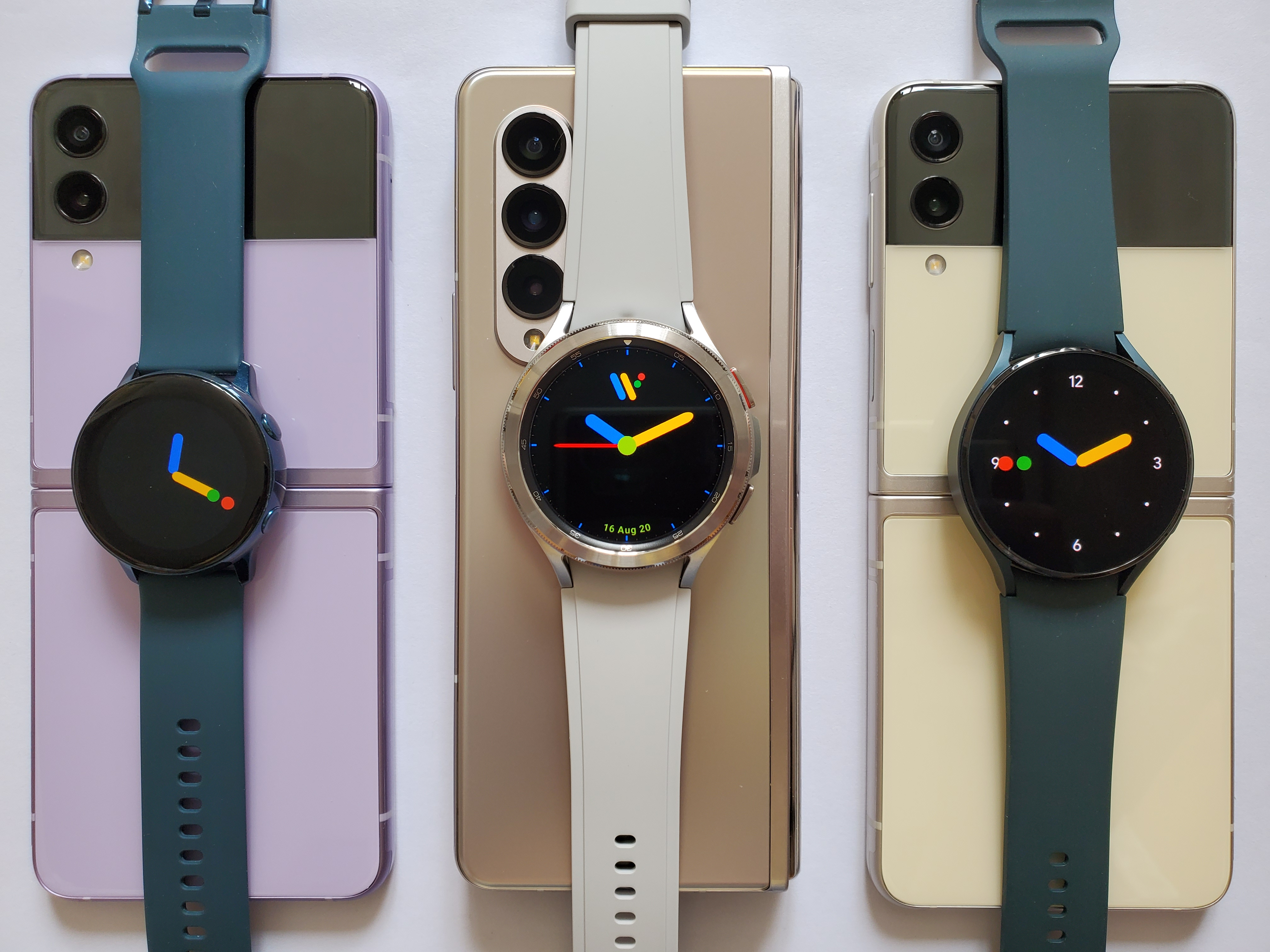
Smartwatches

A smartwatch is a computer worn on the wrist, a wireless digital device that may have the capabilities of a cellphone, portable music player, or a personal digital assistant. By the early 2010s some had the general capabilities of a smartphone, having a processor with a mobile operating system capable of running a variety of mobile apps.

The first smartwatch was the Linux Watch, developed in 1998 by Steve Mann which he presented on February 7, 2000. Seiko launched the Ruputer in Japan- it was a wristwatch computer and it had a 3.6 MHz processor. In 1999, Samsung launched the world's first watch phone. It was named the SPH-WP10. It had a built-in speaker and mic, a protruding antenna and a monochrome LCD screen and 90 minutes of talk time. IBM made a prototype of a wristwatch that was running the Linux operating system. The first version had 6 hours battery life and it got extended to 12 in its more advanced version. It was improved by IBM with an accelerometer, a vibrating mechanism and a fingerprint sensor. IBM joined with Citizen Watch Co. to create the WatchPad. It featured a 320x240 QVGA monochrome touch-sensitive display and it ran Linux version 2.4. It displayed calendar software, Bluetooth, 8 MB RAM, and 16 MB of flash memory. It was targeted at students and businessmen at a price of about $399. Fossil released the Wrist PDA, a watch that ran Palm OS and contained 8 MB of RAM and 4 MB of flash memory and featured an integrated stylus and a resolution of 160x160. It was criticized for its weight of 108 grams and was discontinued in 2005.

In early 2004, Microsoft released the SPOT smartwatch. The company demonstrated it working with coffee makers, weather stations and clocks with SPOT technology. The smartwatch had information like weather, news, stocks, and sports scores transmitted through FM waves. Customers had to buy a subscription to use it.

In 2010, Sony Ericsson launched the Sony Ericsson LiveView, a wearable watch device which is an external BT display for an Android Smartphone.

Pebble was an innovative smartwatch that raised 10.3 million dollars on Kickstarter between April 12 and May 18 of 2012. This watch had a 32 millimeter 144x168 pixel black and white memory LCD manufactured by Sharp with a backlight, a vibrating motor, a magnetometer, an ambient light sensor, and a three-axis accelerometer. It can communicate with an Android or iOS device using both BT 2.1 and BT 4.0 using Stonestreet One's Bluetopia+MFI software stack.

As of July 2013 companies that were making smartwatches or were involved in smartwatch developments are: Acer, Apple, BlackBerry, Foxconn, Google, LG, Microsoft, Qualcomm, Samsung, Sony, VESAG and Toshiba. Some notable ones from this list are HP, HTC, Lenovo and Nokia. Many smartwatches were released at CES 2014. The model featured a curved AMOLED display and a built-in 3G modem.

On September 9, 2014, Apple Inc. announced its first smartwatch named the Apple Watch and released early 2015. In 2014, Microsoft released Microsoft Band, a smart fitness tracker and their first watch since SPOT in early 2004.

During a September 2018 keynote, Apple introduced an Apple Watch Series 4. It had a larger display and an EKG feature to detect abnormal heart function. Qualcomm released their Snapdragon 3100 chip the same month. It is a successor to the Wear 2100 with power efficiency and a separate low power core that can run basic watch functions as well as slightly more advanced functions such as step tracking.

== See also ==
- History of timekeeping devices
- Horology
