= Tattnall =

Tattnall may refer to:

People:

- Edward Fenwick Tattnall (1788–1832), American politician, soldier and lawyer
- Josiah Tattnall (disambiguation), multiple people

Georgia:

- Tattnall County, Georgia, county located in the U.S. state of Georgia
- Tattnall Square Academy, independent, non-profit, Christian, college preparatory academy in Macon, Georgia
- The Tattnall Journal, the oldest weekly newspaper serving Tattnall County, Georgia

United States Navy:

- Tattnall-class destroyer or Wickes-class destroyer (DD-75 to DD-185), a group of 111 destroyers built by the United States Navy in 1917–1919
- USS Tattnall (DD-125), Wickes-class destroyer in the United States Navy during the World War I
- USS Tattnall (DDG-19), Charles F. Adams-class guided missile-armed destroyer of the United States Navy

== See also ==
- Tattenhall
- Tatton Hall
- Tettenhall
- Tutnall
