= CSAC =

CSAC may refer to:

- Czecho Slovakian Activist Crew
- California State Athletic Commission
- California Student Aid Commission
- Colonial States Athletic Conference
- California State Association of Counties
- Citizens' Stamp Advisory Committee
- Chip-scale atomic clock
- Clinical Substance Abuse Counselor
