= Hoptroff =

British time-signal provider and former timepiece maker

Hoptroff London
- Type: Private
- Founded: 2010
- Founders: Richard Hoptroff, Simon Kenny, David Hulbert
- Headquarters: London, England
- Products: Traceable Time as a Service (TTaaS)
- Website: hoptroff.com

Hoptroff is a provider of distributed timing services, based in London, England.

The company was previously a watch manufacturer based in London, England, known for its atomic clock and high accuracy watches.

== History ==
Hoptroff was founded in 2010 as Hoptroff London by Richard Hoptroff, a physicist with the original intention of supplying smart mechanical watch movements to the industry. In 2012, the company incorporated Bluetooth Low Energy technology to its watches for the movement and sync with the mobile phones for configuration in order to display internet connected information.

In April 2013, the company unveiled its first atomic timepiece in London, which conceptualized it as a new variety of time regulation devices in clocks and watches, that could be placed alongside the balance spring, quartz crystal and the pendulum. After the launch, the brand gained a reputation for the most accurate watch ever produced and was mentioned in several media outlets, such as New York Times, Engadget, The Telegraph and others. In 2015, Hoptroff London launched a classic quartz watch range with a claim to being the first watchmaker to achieve better than one second per year accuracy in its quartz watches.

In 2015, the company moved away from watch production to focus on high accuracy time synchronization software for companies operating across distributed infrastructure. The company repositioned itself as Hoptroff London Limited and started work building a proprietary network of timing hubs, incorporating Grand Master atomic clocks, in London, New York and Tokyo.

In 2019, Hoptroff successfully raised £983,610 through crowd funding, with the goal towards developing a global distributed timing network.

== Technology ==
Hoptroff London watches are advertised by the company as "The most accurate timepieces in the world”. Its atomic timepieces use chip scale atomic clock technology, where a small vessel of Caesium 133 is exposed to 130 °C. A laser is used to excite the atoms and a microwave resonator which causes the hyperfine transition frequency of the atoms. The resultant watch after this process has a higher accuracy of 1.5 seconds every thousand years.

However, the technology used its quartz timepieces is still unknown to the public.

== See also ==
- Bluetooth low energy
- Chip-scale atomic clock
