= Daniel Sedgwick =

English hymnologist and bookseller

Daniel Sedgwick (1814–1879) was an English hymnologist and bookseller.

== Life ==
Daniel was born in London and baptised on 25 December 1814 at St Katherine Cree church, London. He was apprenticed as a shoemaker but in 1837 gave up his profession and started to sell books. He married Hannah Tatum in 1835.

Sedgwick died of heart disease at 93 Sun Street, Bishopsgate on 10 March 1879, and was buried in Abney Park Cemetery, Stoke Newington. His wife Hannah was the executor of his will.

== Works ==
He became an expert in theological books, especially hymn-books, later publishing reprints of some rare hymn-writers of the 17th and 18th century. He did not learn to write until 1840, but then began to edit and publish hymnological books, including A Comprehensive Index of ... Original Authors and Translators of Psalms and Hymns (1860, 2nd enlarged edn 1863). This brought him wide respect as a hymnologist, and he was consulted by many hymn-book editors, including C. H. Spurgeon, Josiah Miller, Sir Roundell Palmer (Lord Selbourne), and the editors of Hymns Ancient and Modern. His manuscripts were used by John D. Julian in preparing the Dictionary of Hymnology of 1892. He was a careful scholar, though not always accurate, and he pioneered a branch of hymnological studies which many have since followed.
