= Josiah Collins =

Josiah Collins may refer to:

- Josiah Collins (North Carolina politician) (1807–1826), North Carolina State Senator
- Josiah Collins (Washington fire chief) (1864–1949), Washington State Senator and Seattle Fire Commissioner
