= Benjamin L. Clapp =

American Mormon leader (1814–1865)

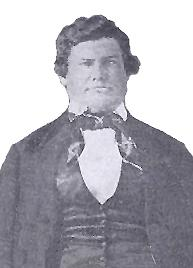

First Seven Presidents of the Seventy
- December 2, 1845 – June 7, 1859
- Called by: Brigham Young
- End reason: Excommunicated for apostasy

Personal details
- Born: Benjamin Lynn Clapp; August 19, 1814; West Huntsville, Alabama
- Died: October 31, 1865 (aged 51); Liberty, California
- Spouse(s): Mary Schultz; Ane C. Diedrick; Elvira Randall; Ann Bingham
- Children: 12
- Parents: Ludwick Lewis Clapp; Margaret Ann Loy

Benjamin Lynn Clapp (August 19, 1814 – October 31, 1865) was an early Mormon leader and member of the First Seven Presidents of the Seventy of the Church of Jesus Christ of Latter-day Saints.

Clapp was born in West Huntsville, Alabama, and married Mary Schultz in 1832. He was baptized at some point before February 26, 1836, when Wilford Woodruff ordained him a priest. He served with Woodruff as a missionary in Kentucky, where Woodruff recorded the following experience:

While traveling in the night, with Brother Benjamin L. Clapp and others, a tremendous storm of wind and rain overtook us. We came to a creek which had swollen to such an extent by the rain, that we could not cross without swimming our horses; several of the company were females. We undertook to head the stream, to ford it; but in the attempt, in the midst of the darkness and the raging of the wind and rain, we were lost in the thick woods, amidst the rain, wind, creeks and fallen treetops. We crossed streams nearly twenty times. I was reminded of Paul's perils by water; but the Lord was merciful unto us in the midst of our troubles, for while we were groping in the dark, running the risk of killing both ourselves and animals, by riding off precipitous bluffs, a bright light suddenly shone round about us, and revealed our perilous situation, as were upon the edge of a deep gulf. The light continued with us until we found a house, and learned the right road; then the light disappeared, and we were enabled to reach the house of Brother Henry Thomas, at nine o'clock, all safe, having rode twenty miles, five hours in the storm; and we felt to thank the Lord for our preservation.

Clapp was set apart as one of the Seven Presidents of the Seventy on December 2, 1845. He replaced Daniel S. Miles, who had died. After moving west, he settled in Ephraim, Utah Territory, where he conflicted with Bishop Warren S. Snow. He was subsequently dropped from the Presidency and excommunicated for apostasy on April 7, 1859. Jacob Gates took his place in the church hierarchy.

Clapp died in Liberty, California, on October 31, 1865, "with a firm conviction of the truth of the latter-day work." By this time, some of his wives and children had become members of the Reorganized Church of Jesus Christ of Latter Day Saints.
