= Josiah Collins (North Carolina politician) =

American politician (1807–1863)

Josiah Collins III
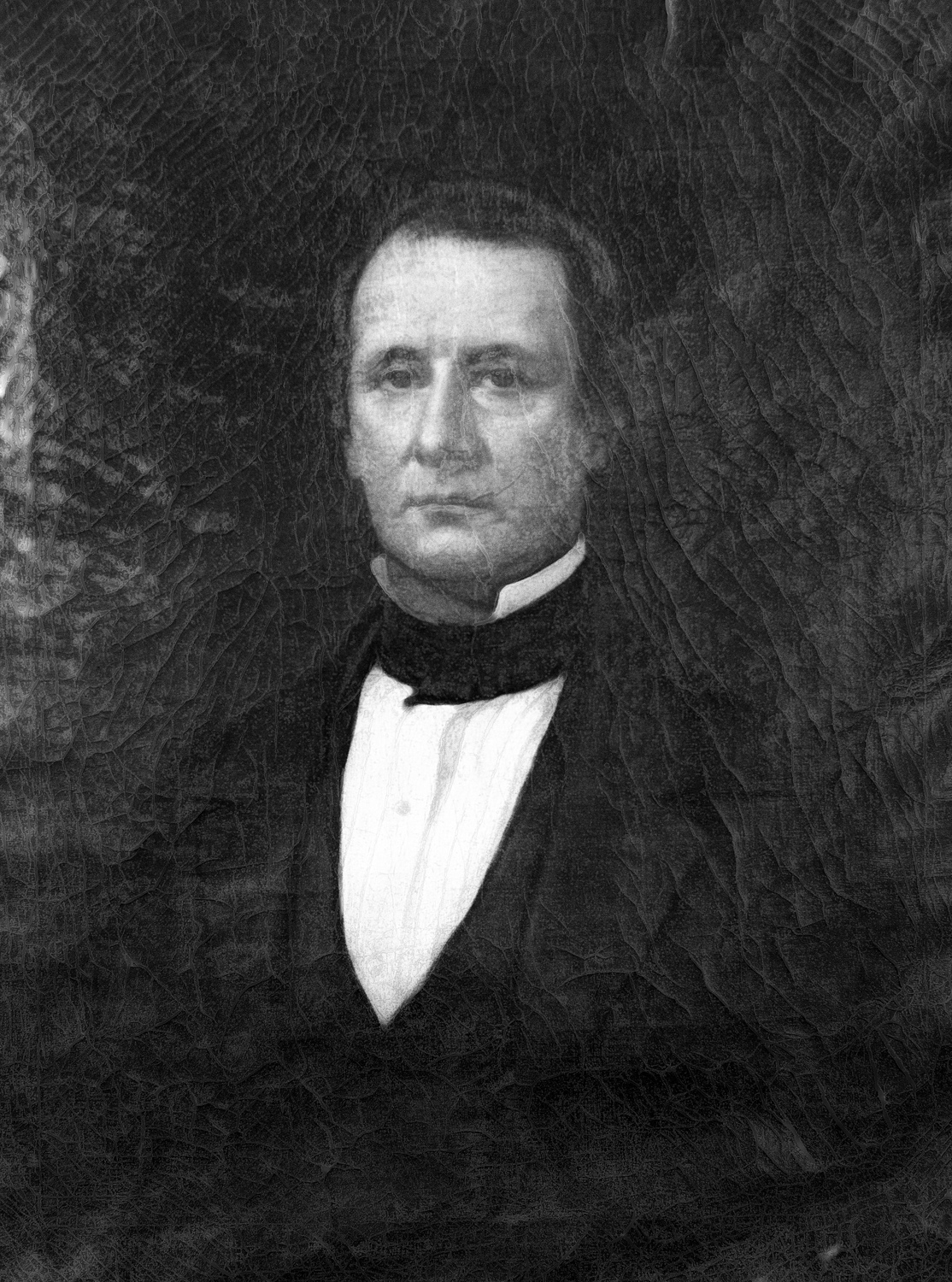
- Portrait of Collins

Member of the North Carolina Senate from the Washington County district
- In office 1832–1833
- Preceded by: Samuel Davenport
- Succeeded by: Charles Phelps

Personal details
- Born: March 1808 Edenton, North Carolina, U.S.
- Died: June 17, 1863 (aged 55) Hillsborough, North Carolina, U.S.
- Party: Whig
- Spouse: Mary Riggs (m. 1829)
- Relatives: Josiah Collins V (grandson); William Biddle Shepard (brother-in-law)
- Education: Yale College
- Occupation: Lawyer; politician; farmer

Josiah Collins III (March 1808 – June 17, 1863) was an American lawyer, politician and slaveholder from North Carolina. He served in the North Carolina Senate and was the owner of Somerset Place.

== Early life ==
Josiah Collins III was born in March 1808 in Edenton, North Carolina, to Ann Rebecca (née Daves) and Josiah Collins II. His grandfather Josiah Collins had a shipping empire and ropewalk. His father was a wealthy planter. He graduated from Yale College in 1826. He then studied at Litchfield Law School.

== Career ==
In January 1830, Collins moved into a house built for him at his family's Somerset estate between Lake Scuppernong and Chowan River. He was the first of three generations of Collins to live there and prior to his move, his father improved the plantation's infrastructure and increased the slave count. At the time, the plantation had thousands of acres of land. According to one source, he inherited almost 300 slaves. This plantation later became the Somerset Place Historic Site. He was one of the three largest slaveholders in North Carolina. In 1836, he built a chapel on his land and hired E. M. Forbes to convert the slaves from Methodism to the Episcopal Church.

Collins was a Whig. He served as a member of North Carolina Senate, representing Washington County from 1832 to 1833. He was opposed to abolitionism. He was a delegate to the North Carolina Constitutional Convention of 1835 and served on a committee to arrange senatorial districts. In 1850, he ran unsuccessfully as a Whig for the North Carolina House of Commons.

== Personal life ==
Collins married Mary Riggs of New Jersey or New York in August 1829. Collins was described as having an "aggressive type of hospitality" and was known to throw lavish parties and entertain numerous guests at his Somerset plantation. He was a member of the Episcopal Church and hired his own personal chaplain.

During the Civil War, Collins was driven from his home by Union forces. He died on June 17, 1863, at his residence in Hillsborough. His sister Annie Daves married William Biddle Shepard. His grandson Josiah Collins V was an attorney and Seattle civil servant who serving as fire commissioner.

== Legacy ==
Following his death, the Collins family attempted to restore Somerset Place. They were forced to sell the property to creditors in 1867. The state of North Carolina later made the plantation a state historic site.
