= Josiah F. Wedgwood =

Josiah Francis Wedgwood, also known as Josiah Wedgwood VII (February 1, 1950 - November 27, 2009) was an American physician and paediatric immunologist.

In 1982 he married Ruth Glushien, daughter of Morris P. Glushien. They had one son, Josiah Ruskin Wedgwood (born 1998).

Wedgwood died unexpectedly on November 27, 2009, while in Paris to meet his family for Thanksgiving, from an undetermined cause.

== Additional sources ==
- The Times Times obituary
- http://www.primaryimmune.org/admin_content/admin_files/12-17-09_TributetoJosiahWedgwood.pdf
- https://wedgwoodfamily.blogspot.com/2010/01/dr-josiah-francis-wedgwood-1950-2009.html
- J Allergy Clin Immunol. 2010 Feb;125(2):506. Epub 2009 Dec 29.
- https://www.washingtonpost.com/wp-dyn/content/article/2009/12/25/AR2009122501834.html Washington post obituary
