= Josiah Wedgwood (disambiguation) =

Josiah Wedgwood may refer to any of the following British potters and entrepreneurs:

- Josiah Wedgwood I (1730–1795), Founder of the pottery firm
- Josiah Wedgwood II (1769–1843), son of the first Josiah Wedgwood, head of the firm
- Josiah Wedgwood III (1795–1880), son of the second Josiah Wedgwood
- Josiah Wedgwood, 1st Baron Wedgwood (Josiah Wedgwood IV, 1872–1943), great-grandson of the second Josiah Wedgwood, great nephew of the third Josiah Wedgwood. Politician
- Josiah Wedgwood V (1899–1968), son of the fourth Josiah Wedgwood, last Wedgwood to head the pottery firm. Father of the sixth Josiah Wedgwood (a doctor in Washington state)
- Josiah F. Wedgwood (Josiah Wedgwood VII, 1950–2009), son of the sixth Josiah Wedgwood, doctor in Massachusetts and husband of Ruth Wedgwood, a university law professor
