= Daniel S. Miles =

American Mormon leader (1772–1845)

First Seven Presidents of the Seventy
- April 6, 1837 – October 12, 1845
- Called by: Joseph Smith, Jr.

Personal details
- Born: Daniel Sanborn Miles; July 23, 1772; Sanbornton, Province of New Hampshire
- Died: October 12, 1845 (aged 73); Hancock County, Illinois, United States
- Resting place: Old Nauvoo Burial Grounds; 40°32′12.12″N 91°21′2.16″W
- Spouse(s): Electa Chamberlin
- Parents: Josiah Miles; Marah Sanborn

Daniel Sanborn Miles (July 23, 1772 – October 12, 1845) was an early Mormon leader and member of the Presidency of the Seventy of the Church of Jesus Christ of Latter Day Saints.

== Life ==
Miles was born in Sanbornton, New Hampshire, on July 23, 1772, to Josiah Miles and Marah Sanborn. In Ryegate, Vermont, on September 30, 1813, he married Electa Chamberlin, with whom he had one son. Miles was baptized by Orson Pratt and Lyman E. Johnson in April 1832 in Bath, New Hampshire. He joined the Latter Day Saints in Kirtland, Ohio, in 1836. On February 28, 1836, Miles was made an elder in the church. He was ordained one of the Seventy later that year on December 20 by Hazen Aldrich. Then, on April 6, 1837, he was called as "one of the First Seven Presidents of the Seventies", a role he held until his death.

Miles moved to Missouri in March 1838. While in Missouri, he attended an April 6, 1838, solemn assembly in Far West. He was among the first Mormons to settle in Nauvoo, Illinois, moving there in 1839. He is mentioned in a Doctrine and Covenants revelation, D&C 124:138, dated January 19, 1841. Miles died on October 12, 1845, at the home of Josiah Butterfield in Hancock County, Illinois. He was remembered as being "faithful and constant to his Seventy call".
