= Josiah Thomas =

Josiah Thomas may refer to:

- Josiah Thomas (cricketer) (1910–1960), Australian cricketer
- Josiah Thomas (politician) (1863–1933), Australian miner and politician
- Josiah Thomas (priest) (1760–1820), English Archdeacon
