= Ruth Wedgwood =

American legal scholar (born 1949)

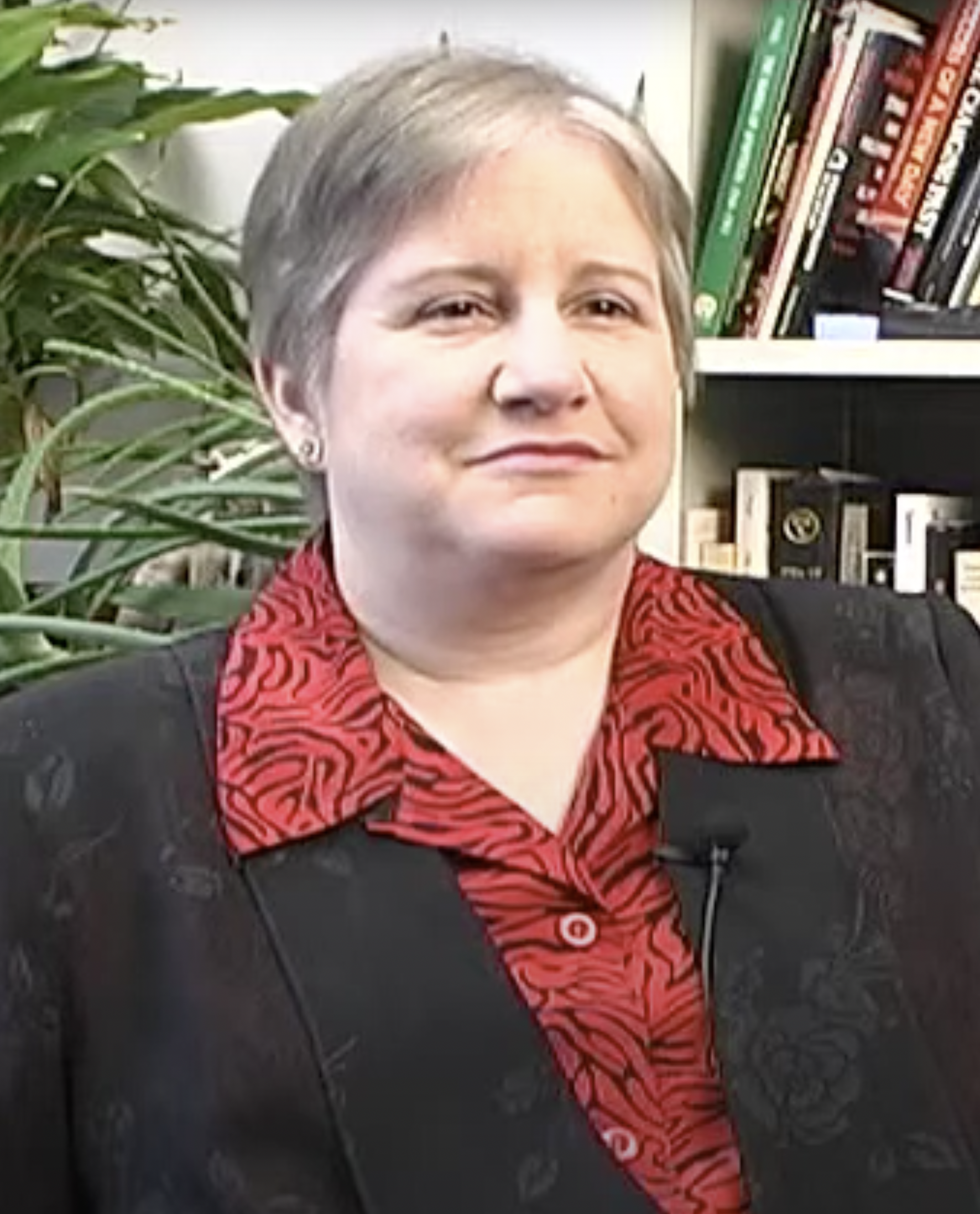
- Wedgwood in 2004
- Born: 1949 (age 76–77)
- Education: Harvard University (BA); Yale University (JD)
- Scientific career
- Fields: International law
- Workplaces: Johns Hopkins University

Ruth Glushien Wedgwood (born 1949) is an American legal scholar who holds the Edward B. Burling Chair in International Law and Diplomacy at the School of Advanced International Studies of Johns Hopkins University.

== Biography ==
Ruth Wedgwood is the daughter of labor lawyer Morris P. Glushien, former general counsel of the International Ladies Garment Workers Union who served as a World War II cryptanalyst, and Anne Sorelle Williams, an artist.

Wedgwood received her undergraduate degree from Harvard University, where she graduated magna cum laude, and her legal education at Yale Law School, where she was executive editor of the Yale Law Journal. She was a law clerk to renowned Judge Henry Friendly of the United States Court of Appeals for the Second Circuit then Justice Harry Blackmun at the U.S. Supreme Court. In 1982, she married her Harvard classmate, National Institutes of Health immunologist Josiah F. Wedgwood, a member of the Wedgwood pottery family.

== Career ==
Wedgwood is a member of the Crimes Against Humanity Initiative Advisory Council, a project of the Whitney R. Harris World Law Institute at Washington University School of Law in St. Louis to establish the world’s first treaty on the prevention and punishment of crimes against humanity. She has expertise in the fields of international law, international criminal law, the law of armed conflict, and human rights law.

In 2002, Wedgwood was elected to serve as the U.S. member of the United Nations Human Rights Committee. She currently serves as a member of the board of directors of Freedom House a nonpartisan NGO that promotes human rights and democracy world-wide.

== See also ==
- List of law clerks for the second seat of the Supreme Court of the United States
