= Josiah Bartlett (disambiguation) =

Josiah Bartlett (1729–1795) was an American physician and revolutionary.

Josiah Bartlett may also refer to:

- Josiah Bartlett Jr. (1767–1838), American politician
- Josiah Bartlet, a character in the television series The West Wing
