= Josiah Smith (disambiguation) =

Josiah Smith (1738–1803) was an American politician.

Josiah Smith may also refer to:

- Josiah Smith (clergyman) (1704–1781), clergyman in colonial South Carolina
- Josiah William Smith (1816–1887), English barrister, legal writer and judge
