= Josiah Conder =

Josiah Conder may refer to:

- Josiah Conder (architect) (1852–1920), British architect, first teacher of Japanese architects to build western-style buildings in Japan
- Josiah Conder (editor and author) (1789–1855), British author and editor
