= Josiah Russell =

English Victorian-era soft-drinks entrepreneur

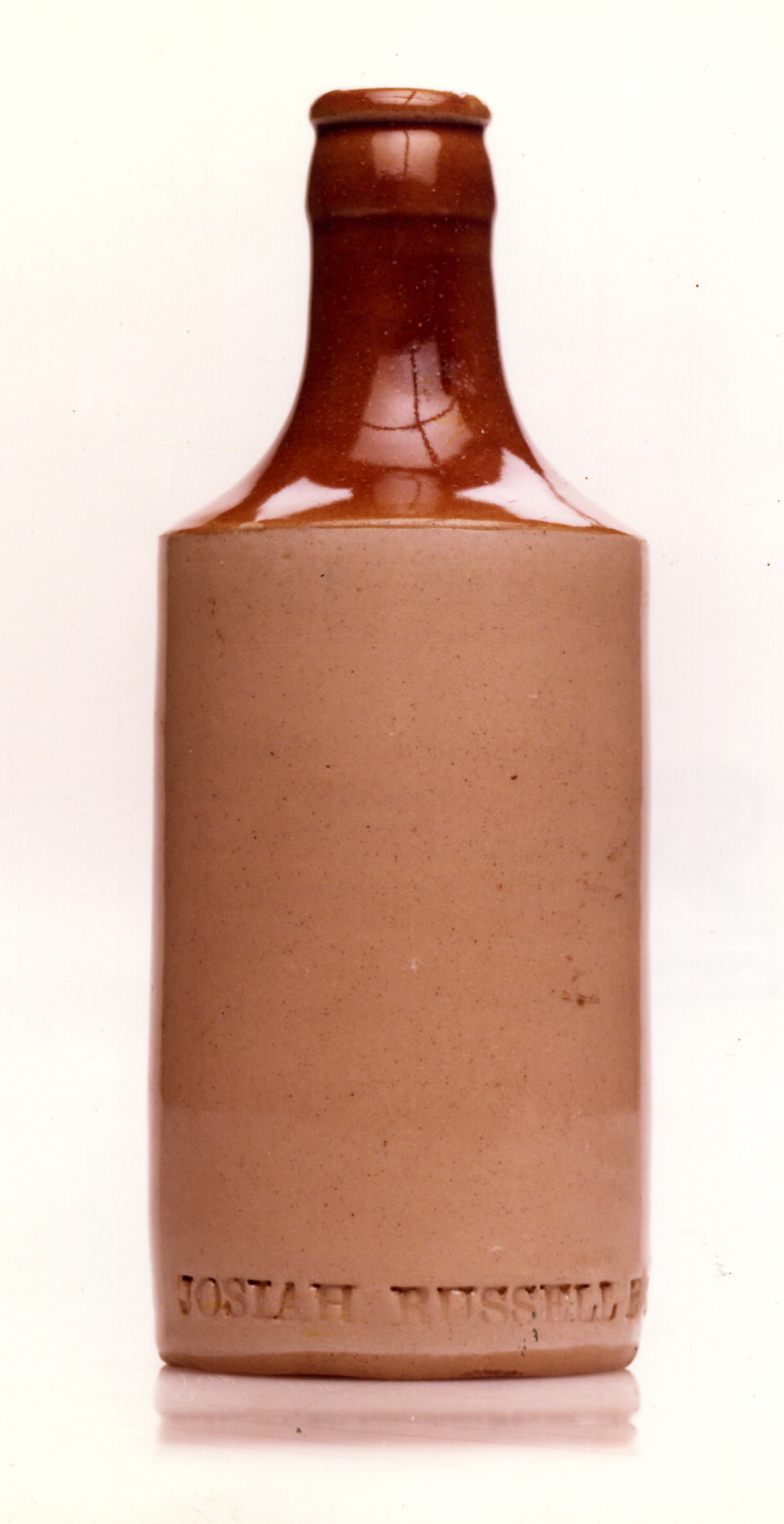
1930s stoneware bottle used by Dutch Josiah Russell company

Josiah Russell (Bexhill, 1844-Bexhill, 1911), was a manufacturer of sodas and mineral waters from London. Products of Josiah Russell were exported to Australia, South-Africa and several other countries. By 1881 his products were also available on the Dutch market. Among these products were tonic and ginger ale, flavours hitherto almost unknown to Dutch consumers. In 1887 Josiah Russell opened a second factory in Rotterdam. Little is known about the life of the entrepreneur Josiah Russell. His obituary and census data indicate that after his retirement Josiah Russell returned to his native town Bexhill, where he lived at his brothers house and died in 1911.

== Expansion on Dutch market ==
Following the start of the Rotterdam factory, Russell set up different agencies throughout the Netherlands to increase his sales. From 1895 on daily management of the Rotterdam factory was handled by James Henry Marsh, a son of Russell’s business partner Edward Marsh. Shortly thereafter the factory moved from the city center to the suburb village of Hillegersberg, that would later become a part of Rotterdam. In 1905 the business relation between Josiah Russell and Edward Marsh ended. The factory in Hillegersberg was continued by Marsh and his son who remained the right to use the name Josiah Russell & Co. in the Netherlands.

== Continuation of Dutch factory ==
In 1912 Josiah Russell & Co. relaunched its tonic water under the new brand name Club Tonic, to boost its sales and increase its fame on the Dutch market.

Shortly after the German occupation of the Netherlands (1940) the factory of Josiah Russell & Co. in Hillegersberg was voluntarily handed over to a local competitor, N.V. Handelmaatschappij v/h J.C. Tims, whose own factory had been destroyed during the bombardment of Rotterdam. This action was probably prompted by the fear that the factory, being British-owned, would otherwise be assigned to a German Verwalter (caretaker). After the Second World War J.C. Tims officially took over the Josiah Russell factory (1949).

In 1969 N.V. Handelmaatschappij v/h J.C. Tims was taken over by the much larger, Heineken-owned soft drink company Vrumona (Bunnik). In 2016, inspired by the history of the Josiah Russell company, Vrumona introduced a series of soft drink flavours under the new brand name Russell & Co.
