= Josiah Mills =

English cricketer

Josiah Mills (25 October 1862 – 23 November 1929) was an English cricketer. He was a right-handed batsman and a wicket-keeper. He was born and died in Oldham, Lancashire.

Mills made one first-class appearance for Lancashire during the 1889 season. In the single inning in which he batted, he scored one run. He made one catch and one stumping.
