= Josiah Partridge =

Josiah Partridge (March 1805 – 27 November 1897) was a lawyer in the early days of the British Colony of South Australia.

== History ==
Partridge emigrated to South Australia aboard Rajasthan, an unaccompanied widower, arriving in November 1838 and settled on what became Partridge Street, Glenelg.

Partridge was one of the first seven lawyers to be registered in South Australia. He practised in Adelaide as a solicitor in partnership with James George Nash, and had a reputation for honest dealing. He was mostly involved in conveyancing until the Torrens Act reduced the amount of litigation involved in such transactions. He suffered a back injury from falling off his horse while commuting between Glenelg and Adelaide, and for many years he could not sit up, and around 1856 sold his business to Herford & Boucaut, the latter at the onset of an illustrious career that would see him Judge of the Supreme Court and Premier of the Colony. A few years later he retired to "Malvern", a country property near Clarendon, where he remained. He recovered his health to some extent, and took daily horseback rides until his final illness. He became deaf, but his eyesight was perfect and he retained his mental faculties to the end.

Partridge married the eldest daughter of William Giles, of the South Australian Company. They both died at "Malvern", she a few years before him; they were survived by five sons and four daughters.

== Family ==
Josiah Partridge (March 1805 – 27 November 1897) was a son of Birmingham merchant John Partridge (1773–1840) and his wife Mary née Stroud (died 1853). He married Fanny Huckvale who died sometime before he embarked on Rajasthan for South Australia in July 1838.

He married Mary Giles (c. 1818 – 19 September 1893) in Adelaide on 25 June 1840. She was a daughter of William Giles, who arrived in SA in 1837. Their children included:

- John William Partridge (13 October 1841 – 1922) was one of the first two students at Adelaide Educational Institution. He married Georgina Ann Little Needham (c. 1839 – 31 October 1931) on 1 September 1864. She was a daughter of John's Classics master. They moved to New South Wales, she died in Chatswood, NSW
- Edith Sarah Partridge (31 January 1843 – ) married John Balfour Anderson ( – ) on 22 June 1872. He was manager, Bank of Australasia, Dunedin, New Zealand.
- Henry Partridge (26 January 1845 – 14 December 1915) married Mary Strawbridge ( – ) on 19 December 1874. Also an AEI scholar, Henry became a Parkin missionary on Kangaroo Island.
- Mary Partridge (4 October 1846 – 16 May 1928)
- Josiah Stroud Partridge (31 August 1848 – 6 April 1927) married Julia Jaffrey ( – ) on 31 August 1880. He had fellmonger business at Saltia, South Australia, insolvent 1884, discovered coal reserves nearby then had an orchard. He died at Port Augusta after being thrown from his buggy when a wheel collapsed.
- Thomas Partridge (29 May 1850 – ) married Eva Crawford ( – ) on 20 December 1893. He was with his brother Josiah at Saltia.
- J(ames) Roper Partridge (13 May 1852 – )
- Ellen Isabella Partridge (21 May 1854 – )
- Fanny Huckvale Partridge (11 August 1856 – 22 October 1931)

Several members of the family were interred at the Happy Valley cemetery
