= Josiah Gumede =

Josiah Gumede may refer to:

- Josiah Tshangana Gumede, co-founder of African National Congress
- Josiah Zion Gumede, President of Zimbabwe Rhodesia
