= Josiah Griffin Ely =

American politician (1829-1886)

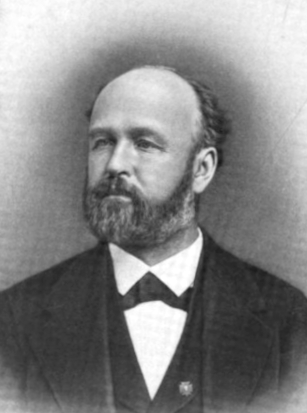

Member of the Connecticut House of Representatives
- In office 1875

Personal details
- Born: February 22, 1829 Lyme, Connecticut
- Died: April 1, 1886 (aged 57) Hamburg, Connecticut
- Spouse: Elizabeth Chadwick (m. 1855)
- Children: 7
- Education: Yale School of Medicine
- Occupation: Physician, politician

Josiah Griffin Ely (February 22, 1829 – April 1, 1886) was an American medical doctor and politician.

== Biography ==
Ely, son of Abner and Fannie (Guffin) Ely, was born in Lyme, Connecticut.

He graduated from the Yale School of Medicine in 1854. On graduation he settled in Chicago, where he remained in practice for three years, after which he returned to his native town, where he was very successful as a physician, and continued in constant and extensive practice until his death, which occurred from heart disease, at his home, in the village of Hamburg, in Lyme, April 1, 1886, in his 58th year.

He represented the town in the Connecticut General Assembly in 1875, and was twice a candidate for Senator from his district. He also held high position in the masonic order.

On December 3, 1855, he married Elizabeth Chadwick, of Old Lyme, daughter of Capt. Mather Chadwick, by whom he had six daughters and one son, all of whom survived him, the son following his father's profession.
