= Josiah M. Curtis =

American soldier (1844–1875)

- Born: 16 November 1844; Ohio County, Virginia
- Died: 17 June 1875 (aged 30); West Virginia
- Burial place: West Liberty Cemetery
- Military career
- Allegiance: United States of America
- Branch: United States Army
- Rank: Second Lieutenant
- Unit: 12th Regiment West Virginia Volunteer Infantry - Company I
- Awards: Medal of Honor

Second Lieutenant Josiah M. Curtis (16 November 1844 to 17 June 1875) was an American soldier who fought in the American Civil War. Curtis received the country's highest award for bravery during combat, the Medal of Honor, for his action during the Third Battle of Petersburg in Virginia on 2 April 1865. He was honored with the award on 12 May 1865.

== Biography ==
Curtis was born in Ohio County, West Virginia, on 16 November 1844. He enlisted into the 12th West Virginia Infantry. He died on 17 June 1875 and his remains are interred at the West Liberty Cemetery.

== Medal of Honor citation ==
Seized the colors of his regiment after 2 color bearers had fallen, bore them gallantly, and was among the first to gain a foothold, with his flag, inside the enemy's works.

== See also ==
- List of American Civil War Medal of Honor recipients: A–F
