= Josiah Sowande =

Josiah Sobowale Sowande (ca 1858 -1936) also known as Sobo Arobiodu was a Yoruba poet from Abeokuta, Ogun State who was a pioneer writer of Ewi, a Yoruba language style of poetry.

His works were influenced by his Egba upbringing, the activities of the Christian Missionary Society in Egbaland and popular Egba chants, his works majorly focused the Egba Christian converts as primary audience.

== Life ==
Sobowale was born in Abeokuta, ca 1858. He learned to write at the CMS training institution but did not complete his education. He gained employment as a prison guard in the Egba government. He left his guard position to take up farming and writing. Between 1905 and 1934, twelve of his works were published, some by the Egba government printer where his brother worked.

Sowande's works incorporated Orin Arungbe, an oral chant used by the Oro cult.
