= Josiah Francis (disambiguation) =

Josiah Francis (1890–1964) was an Australian politician.

Josiah Francis may also refer to:

- Josiah Francis (Hillis Hadjo) (1770–1818), American religious leader
- Josiah Francis (Queensland politician) (1825–1891), Australian politician
