= Josiah Rees (judge) =

Sir Josiah Rees (1821–1899) was the Chief Justice of Bermuda. He was knighted by letters patent in 1891.
