= The Tattnall Journal =

- Type: Weekly newspaper
- Publisher: Russ Rhoden
- Founded: 1879
- Website: https://tattnalljournal.net/

The Tattnall Journal is the oldest weekly newspaper serving Tattnall County, Georgia. Established in 1879, the newspaper has been in continual publication by the Rhoden family since 1914. The newspaper, which often cites primary sources on Tattnall County history, can be found in the library at University of Georgia, categorized in an archive of Georgia newspapers. Russell J. "Russ" Rhoden (a fourth generation Rhoden) owns and operates the Tattnall Journal, which boasts a circulation of nearly 4,500 newspapers in the county.

The Tattnall Journal currently serves the communities of Reidsville, Glennville, Collins, Cobbtown and Manassas. In 2002, The Tattnall Journal moved from its first location at 149 Folsom Street in Reidsville, Ga., to a new building at 114 North Main Street, also in Reidsville, which is located inside the IGA Shopping Center. The current editor is Allison Cobb.

== Sources ==
The Tattnall Journal

Digital Library of Georgia

University of Georgia's libraries
