= Josiah Alexander =

English cricketer

Personal information
- Full name: Josiah Bracken Canning Alexander
- Born: 12 December 1826; Mayfair, Westminster, London
- Died: 17 October 1882 (aged 65); Barton-upon-Irwell, Lancashire, England

Career statistics
Competition	First-class
Matches	1
Runs scored	3
Batting average	3.00
100s/50s	0/0
Top score	2*
Catches/stumpings	0/–
- Source: CricketArchive, 3 November 2013

Josiah Bracken Canning Alexander (12 December 1826 – 17 October 1882) was an English first-class cricketer.

Alexander was born at Grosvenor Square, Westminster, the son of East India Company officer Josias Alexander and Mary Bracken. In the mid-18th century, his family amassed enormous fortune and power through the East India Company. James Alexander was his uncle and Du Pré Alexander, 2nd Earl of Caledon, his father's cousin.

He made a single appearance in first-class cricket for the Gentlemen of Kent against the Gentlemen of England in 1853 at the St Lawrence Ground, Canterbury. In a match which the Gentlemen of England won by 7 wickets, Alexander batted twice, ending the Gentlemen of Kent first-innings not out on 2, while in their second-innings he opened the batting and was dismissed for a single run by Edward Drake.

He died in 1882 at Barton-upon-Irwell, Lancashire.
