= Morris P. Glushien =

American lawyer

Morris P. Glushien (October 15, 1909 - May 19, 2006) was an American labor lawyer. He resigned in 1947 from the National Labor Relations Board in protest due to the Taft-Hartley Act and then acted as counsel to the International Ladies Garment Workers Union. In 1957 he argued the landmark free-speech case Staub v. Baxley before the Supreme Court of the United States and won.

He was the father of the international lawyer Ruth Wedgwood.
