= Josiah Scott =

Josiah Scott may refer to:

- Josiah Scott (politician) (1803–1879), American politician
- Josiah Scott (American football) (born 1999), American football cornerback

== See also ==
- Josiah Scott House, on the National Register of Historic Places in Idaho
