= Josiah Haynes Armstrong =

American bishop and legislator (1842–1898)

Bishop Josiah Haynes Armstrong
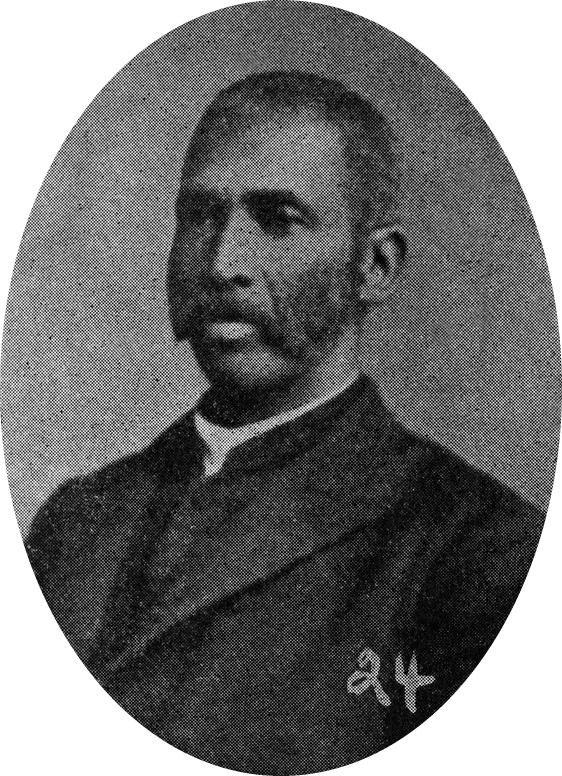

Member of the Florida House of Representatives from the Columbia County district
- In office 1871–1872

Member of the Florida House of Representatives from the Columbia County district
- In office 1875–1875

Personal details
- Born: May 30, 1842 Lancaster, Pennsylvania, U.S.
- Died: March 23, 1898 (aged 55)
- Party: Republican
- Spouse: Louisa Rebecca Martin Grant

Military service
- Allegiance: United States
- Branch/service: United States Army
- Battles/wars: American Civil War

Josiah Haynes Armstrong (May 30, 1842 - March 23, 1898) was a Bishop in the African Methodist Episcopal (A.M.E.) Church and a state legislator in Florida. He served two terms in the Florida House of Representatives representing Columbia County, Florida during the Reconstruction era from 1871-1872 and 1875-1876. The Florida Archives have a photograph of him. According to his Findagrave entry and the photos of his gravestone posted to it he served in a "Colored" unit during the American Civil War.

He was born in Lancaster, Pennsylvania.

== See also ==
- African American officeholders from the end of the Civil War until before 1900
