= Josiah Evans =

Josiah Evans may refer to:

- Josiah J. Evans (1786–1858), United States Senator from South Carolina
- Josiah Evans (1820–1873), British engineer
