= Furlan Marri =

Swiss watchmaker

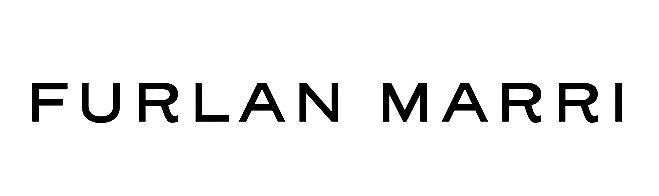
- Type: Société anonyme
- Industry: Watchmaking
- Founded: 2021; 5 years ago
- Founder: Andrea Furlan; Hamad Al Marri
- Headquarters: Geneva, Switzerland
- Key people: Andrea Furlan (CEO, Lead Designer); Hamad Al Marri (Co-founder)
- Products: Watches
- Website: furlanmarri.com

Furlan Marri is a Swiss watch brand based in Geneva, Switzerland. Founded by Andrea Furlan and Hamad Al Marri in Geneva in 2021, the company won the Horological Revelation Prize at the prestigious Grand Prix d'Horlogerie de Genève in the same year.

Known for their timeless and modern designs, Furlan tends to use mecha quartz movement created by Frédéric Piguet and LeCoultre, that earned the brand notoriety.

== History ==
The brand outsources its production to different countries. Since its success within the industry, the brand moved towards developing Swiss automatic movements.
