= Josiah Thomas (cricketer) =

Australian cricketer

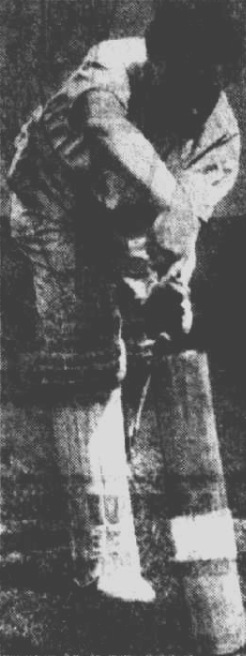

Personal information
- Born: 27 August 1910; Golden Square, Victoria, Australia
- Died: 28 May 1960 (aged 49); Essendon, Victoria, Australia

Domestic team information
- Years: Team
- 1929-1933: Victoria
- Source: Cricinfo, 21 November 2015

Josiah Thomas (27 August 1910 – 28 May 1960) was an Australian cricketer. He played eight first-class cricket matches for Victoria between 1929 and 1933.

== See also ==
- List of Victoria first-class cricketers
