= Josiah Emery =

18th-century watch and clock maker

Josiah Emery (probably November 11, 1725 - between July 2 and July 14, 1794) was a watch and clock maker who improved Thomas Mudge's lever escapement in 1785. One of his watches was presented to Lord Nelson who was wearing it when he was killed by a sniper at the Battle of Trafalgar in 1805. Others were made for George III.

== Biography ==
Emery set up as a watch and clock maker at Cockspur Street, Charing Cross, London. He arrived in England from Geneva in the Republic of Geneva. He was made an honorary member of the London Clockmakers Company.

He made good quality cylinder watches and used the pivoted detent escapement. Thomas Mudge had invented the lever escapement in around 1755, giving timepieces their characteristic ‘tick-tock’ sound. Emery was the first watchmaker to use lever escapement and made some improvements.

== Family ==
Josiah Emery married Anne Jacob (1739-1769) on 4 July 1762 at St Martin in the Fields, Westminster. He had signed the marriage license and its bond on 1 July as Josias Emery, of the parish of St Ann [Soho, Westminster], watchmaker, bachelor, age 30."

Through this first marriage Emery was connected to Westminster-based goldsmiths, jewellers, watchcase makers, and clockmakers, several of them Huguenot or of Huguenot descent.

Emery’s wife Anne Jacob was the eldest daughter of Jean Jacob (1709-1787), also known as John Jacob, a Huguenot goldsmith who had arrived in London c.1732.

Jean Jacob’s wife, Emery’s mother-in-law, was Anne Courtauld (1709-1793), eldest daughter of Augustin Courtauld (1686-1751) the Huguenot goldsmith of St Martin’s Lane in Westminster, and ancestor of the Courtauld family of textile and art collection fame.

Emery’s aunt by marriage, Esther Courtauld (1711-1763), Augustin’s second daughter, had married Etienne/Stephen Goujon (1696-1778), also of Huguenot descent and an eminent watchcase maker in Gerard Street, Westminster.

Emery’s sister-in-law Judith Jacob married in 1767 George Cowles, also goldsmith, originally from Gloucester, who had been apprenticed in 1751 to Anne and Judith’s uncle Samuel Courtauld (1720-1765), goldsmith, with premises in Cornhill opposite the Royal Exchange in the City of London. In 1765, George Cowles went into partnership with Samuel’s widow Louisa Perina Courtauld née Ogier (Louisa Courtauld) after Samuel’s sudden death age 44. The Louisa Courtauld & George Cowles partnership lasted until 1777, by which time Samuel junior was 25.

Emery was also related by marriage, a little more distantly, to Thomas Johnson (c.1727-1775), clockmaker of Grays Inn Passage, who had married Anne Courtauld’s first cousin Anne Bardin (1717-1761). Thomas and Anne’s only surviving son John Johnson (1757-1800) became a clockmaker at the same premises in Grays Inn Passage after his father’s early death.

== Residence and premises ==
Josiah’s premises on Cockspur Street are recorded in Westminster Rate Books and Land Tax Records 1767-1791, and he served on the parish coroner’s inquest jury on occasions in 1771, 1773, 1777 and 1780. The precise address on Cockspur Street is recorded variously at no.2, no.3, no.33 and facing Pall Mall. His brother—in-law Denis Jacob, jeweller and Anne’s half brother, had his premises at 37 Cockspur Street, and the coroner’s inquest into the death of Denis’ wife at home in Nov 1777, refers to the Emerys being the next door neighbours of the Jacobs. There are no records for Josiah Emery in Westminster after 1791.

== Death ==
Josiah Emery died in Chelsea on 2 July 1794, leaving a very short Will written the same day and in French, his mother tongue, leaving all his estate to his second wife Susanna (née Smith b.1746) except £10 to his unmarried and only surviving child Elizabeth. Josiah was buried in the Jacob family vault in St Martin in the Fields Westminster on 7 July 1794, on the same day and together with his niece Mary Jacob, last surviving child of his brother-in-law Augustin Jacob.

Louis Recordon took over the business at 33 Cockspur Street in 1797.

== Daughter ==
Emery’s only surviving child was his daughter Elizabeth b.1765 by his first wife Anne Jacob. Elizabeth married William Reynolds in 1810. We glimpse that Elizabeth was a woman of learning and interested in history. Her uncle Augustin Jacob died with no surviving issue in 1811, sharing his considerable estate between his two surviving siblings and 10 nephews and nieces. To Elizabeth he left family portraits, and most of his book collection, including his books in French: Martin’s French Bible, the French Book of Common Prayer as published 1678, and four volumes of ‘Gil Blas’, and others; also history books in English: Plutarch’s Lives, Josephus’ Jewish Wars, a “Miscellaneous History from the Creation of the World to William the Conqueror”, as well as Chambers Dictionary in 2 folios, a Biographical Dictionary and others.

== Examples of his work ==
- The Nelson watch
- The Prince of Wales watch
