= Josiah Collins (fire chief) =

American politician

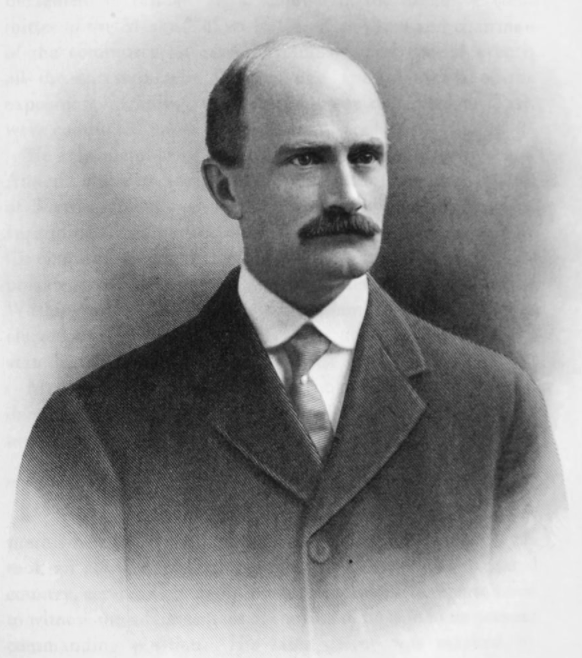

Member of the Washington State Senate
- In office 1911–1915

Personal details
- Born: June 17, 1864 Hillsborough, North Carolina
- Died: July 1, 1949 (aged 85) Seattle, Washington
- Resting place: Lake View Cemetery
- Party: Republican
- Spouse: Caroline Wetherill (m. 1907)
- Children: 2
- Occupation: Lawyer, civil servant, politician
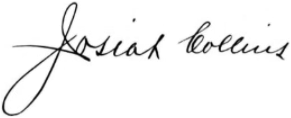
- Signature

Josiah Collins V (1864-1949) was an American attorney, civil servant and politician who was Seattle Fire Commissioner and a State Senator. He was Seattle's Fire Chief at the time of the Great Seattle Fire on June 6, 1889. On that date, he was in San Francisco, attending a regional conference of Fire Chiefs.

== Biography ==
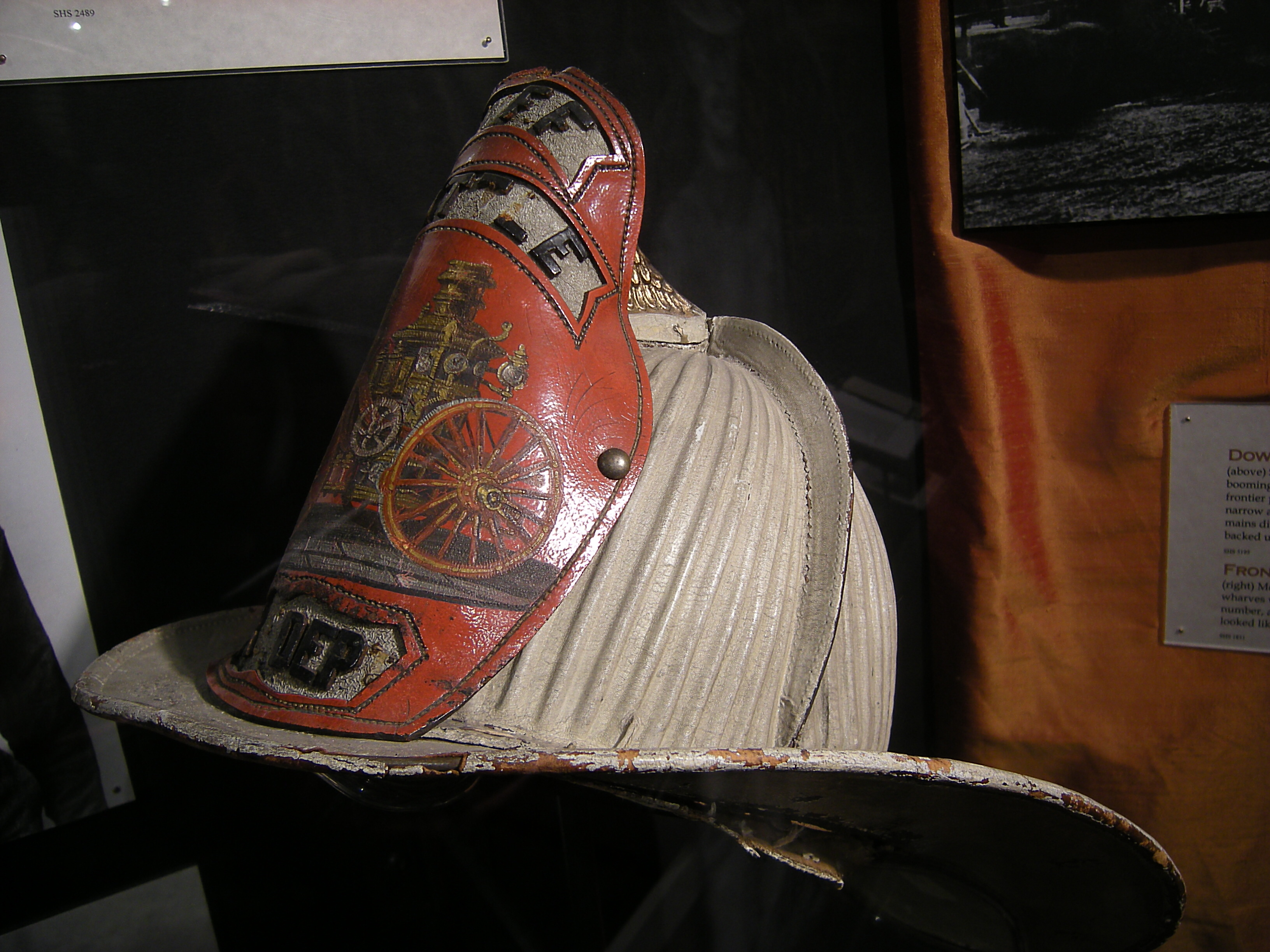
Josiah Collins's fire chief hat on display at MOHAI

Josiah Collins was born in Hillsborough, North Carolina on June 17, 1864. He moved to Washington in 1883, where he became a lawyer.

He was chief of the volunteer fire department at the time of the Great Seattle Fire in 1889.

He was one of the cofounders of the first golf clubs in Seattle at Laurelhurst in 1895.

The Sunday September 18th, 1897 issue of the Victoria, "British Columbia Colonist" mentions him among the first to join the Klondike Gold Rush.

Initially a Democrat, he joined the Republican Party in 1896. He served as a member of the Washington State Senate from 1911 to 1915.

He married Caroline Wetherill in June 1907, and they had two sons.

He died in Seattle on July 1, 1949.
