= Josiah Butterfield =

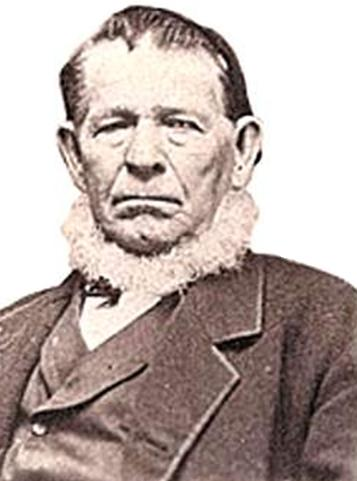

First Seven Presidents of the Seventy
- April 6, 1837 – October 7, 1844
- Called by: Joseph Smith, Jr.
- End reason: Excommunication

Personal details
- Born: March 13, 1795; Dunstable, Massachusetts, United States
- Died: March 3, 1871; Aromas, California, United States

Josiah Butterfield (March 13, 1795 – March 3, 1871) was an early Mormon leader and member of the Presidency of the Seventy of the Church of Jesus Christ of Latter Day Saints.

Butterfield was born in Dunstable, Massachusetts, to parents Abel Butterfield and Mercy Heald. He married Polly Moulton on October 30, 1819. The couple spent the 1820s in Maine, where John F. Boynton and a missionary companion baptized him in 1833. Butterfield relocated to Kirtland, Ohio, in 1834, where he worked on the Kirtland Temple. There he also became a charter member (and stockholder) of the Kirtland Safety Society. He was set apart as one of the seven presidents of Seventy on April 6, 1837. He functioned simultaneously as a member of the Kirtland High Council.

After Polly died on October 28, 1840, Butterfield married Margaret Lawrence, a mother of two daughters. Shortly after this marriage, a conflict arose between Butterfield and Joseph Smith, Jr. over the Lawrence estate, from which Butterfield was set to benefit. Smith represented the two daughters' position. Smith wrote on March 28, 1843, that Butterfield "came to my house and insulted me so outrageously that I kicked him out of the house, across the yard, and into the street." Butterfield became disaffected and was excommunicated on October 7, 1844. Jedediah M. Grant took his place in the Presidency.

Butterfield was later rebaptized and received his endowment in the Nauvoo Temple on January 20, 1846, although he did not travel west with the Mormon pioneers. By 1853, he was on his way to California when he visited his nephew, Thomas Jefferson Butterfield (namesake of Butterfield Canyon) and founder of Herriman, Utah, at Fort Herriman and affirmed his continuing faith in Mormonism.

On his way to California, he met and married Clarinda Cram Walker in Salt Lake City, Utah, on March 27, 1853. They settled near Aromas, California, and had six children together. On May 1, 1865, Butterfield was baptized into the Reorganized Church of Jesus Christ of Latter Day Saints by Glaud Rodger in Watsonville, California. He died March 3, 1871, in Aromas, California.
