= Josiah Tattnall =

Josiah Tattnall may refer to:

- Josiah Tattnall (politician) (1765–1803), American politician, also known as Josiah Tattnall Jr.
- Josiah Tattnall Sr. (b. 1740), British colonist
- Josiah Tattnall III (1794–1871), American naval officer
