= Josiah Miller =

English Congregationalist minister and hymnologist

Josiah Miller (1832 – 1880) was an English Congregationalist minister and hymnologist.

== Life ==
The son of the Rev. Edward Miller, he was born at Putney, Surrey, on 8 April 1832. At age 13 he was articled to an engineering surveyor at Westminster; but he later gave up his articles and entered Highbury College, where he studied for the independent ministry. He graduated B.A. in 1853 and M.A. in 1855 at London University.

He was appointed pastor successively at Dorchester in 1855, at Long Sutton, Lincolnshire, in 1860, and at Newark, Nottinghamshire, in 1868. He gave up this last post in order to become secretary of the British Society for the Propagation of the Gospel Among the Jews. Subsequently he succeeded the Rev. J. Robinson as secretary to the London City Mission.

Miller died on 22 December 1880 at his home, 77 Fortress Road, Kentish Town, London, and was buried at Abney Park Cemetery, Stoke Newington on 28 December 1880.

== Works ==
His principal works are:

- ‘Our Hymns: their Authors and Origin. Being Biographical Sketches of the principal Psalm and Hymn Writers (with Notes on their Psalms and Hymns),’ London, 1866; intended to be a companion to the New Congregational Hymn Book.
- ‘Our Dispensation: or, the place we occupy in the Divine History of the World,’ London, 1868.
- ‘Singers and Songs of the Church; being Biographical Sketches of the Hymn-Writers in all the principal collections,’ 2nd edit. London, 1869.
- ‘Christianum Organum; or, the Inductive Method in Scripture and Science. With an Introduction by J. H. Gladstone,’ London, 1870.
