= Chip-scale atomic clock =

Small form factor atomic clock

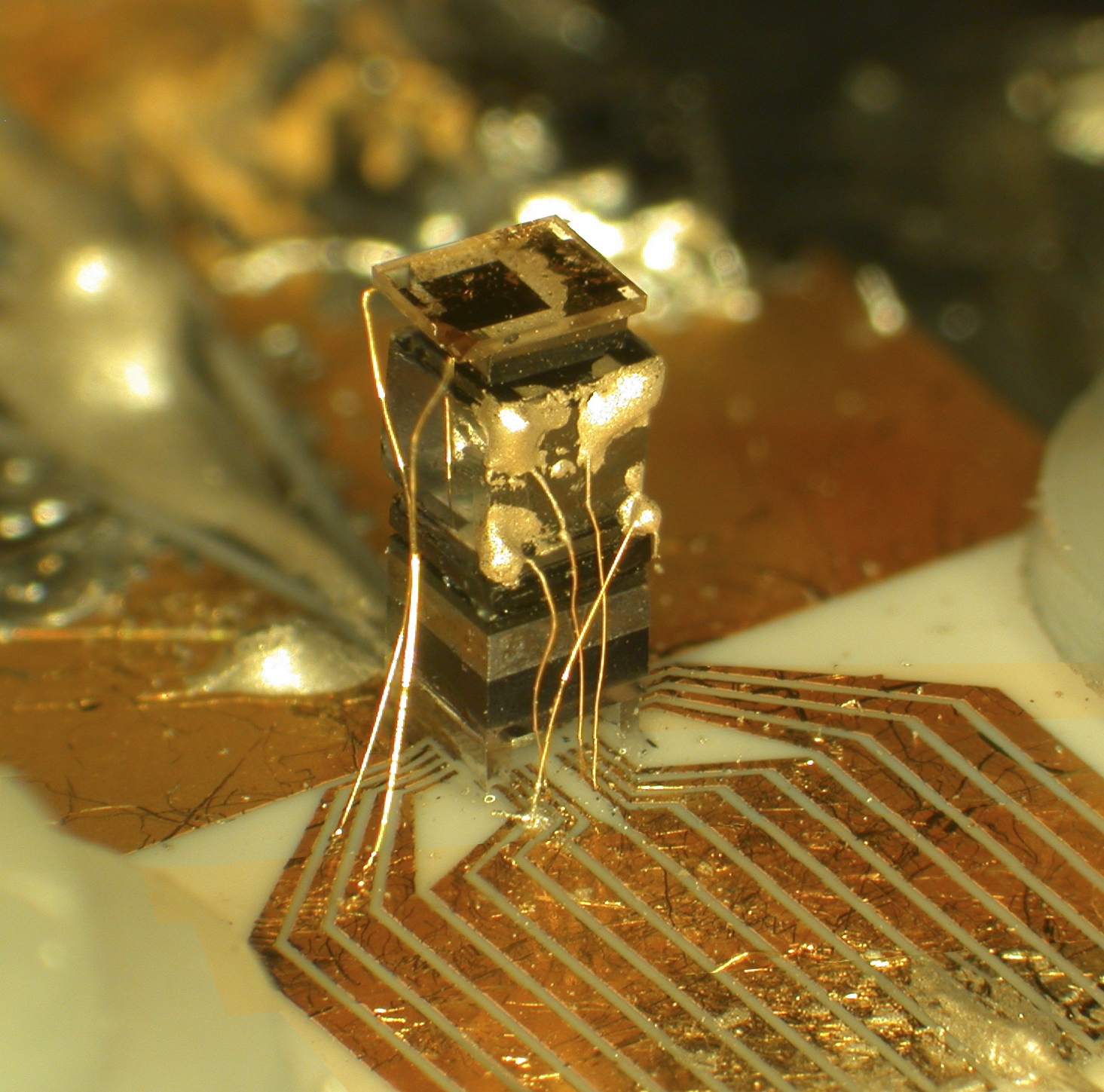
The physics package of the NIST chip-scale atomic clock

A chip scale atomic clock (CSAC) is a compact, low-power atomic clock fabricated using techniques of microelectromechanical systems (MEMS) and incorporating a low-power semiconductor laser as the light source. The first CSAC physics package was demonstrated at the National Institute of Standards and Technology (NIST) in 2003, based on an invention made in 2001. The work was funded by the US Department of Defense's Defense Advanced Research Projects Agency (DARPA) with the goal of developing a microchip-sized atomic clock for use in portable equipment. In military equipment it is expected to provide improved location and battlespace situational awareness for dismounted soldiers when satellite navigation systems, such as the global positioning system, are not available, but many civilian applications are also envisioned. Commercial manufacturing of these atomic clocks began in 2011. The CSAC, the world's smallest atomic clock, is 4 by 3.5 by 1 centimetre (1.6 in × 1.4 in × 0.39 in) in size, weighs 35 grams, consumes only 115 mW of power, and can keep time to within 100 microseconds per day after several years of operation. A more stable design based on the vibration of rubidium atoms was demonstrated by NIST in 2019.

== How it works ==
Like other caesium atomic clocks, the clock keeps time by a precise 9.192631770 GHz microwave signal emitted by electron spin transitions between two hyperfine energy levels in atoms of caesium-133. A feedback mechanism keeps a quartz crystal oscillator on the chip locked to this frequency, which is divided down by digital counters to give 10 MHz and 1 Hz clock signals provided to output pins. On the chip, liquid metal caesium in a tiny 2-millimetre (0.079 in) capsule, fabricated using silicon micromachining techniques, is heated to vaporize the alkali metal. A semiconductor laser shines a beam of infrared light modulated by the microwave oscillator through the capsule onto a photodetector. When the oscillator is at the precise frequency of the transition, the optical absorption of the caesium atoms is reduced, increasing the output of the photodetector. The output of the photodetector is used as feedback in a frequency locked loop circuit to keep the oscillator at the correct frequency.

== Development ==
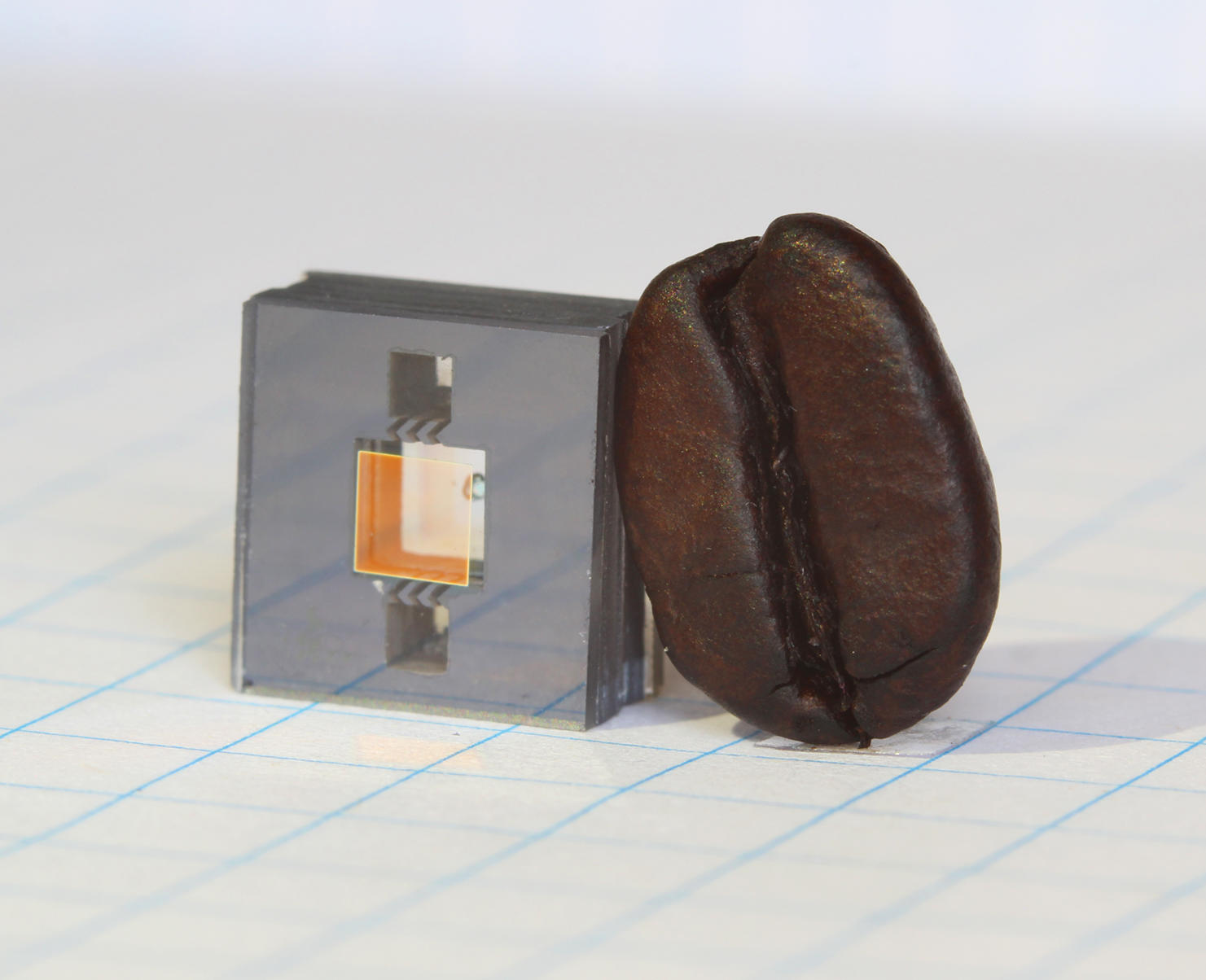
The heart of NIST's next-generation miniature atomic clock – ticking at high "optical" frequencies – is this vapor cell on a chip, shown next to a coffee bean for scale

Conventional vapor cell atomic clocks are about the size of a deck of cards, consume about 10 W of electrical power and cost about US$3,000. Shrinking these to the size of a semiconductor chip required extensive development and several breakthroughs. An important part of development was designing the device so it could be manufactured using standard semiconductor fabrication techniques where possible, to keep its cost low enough that it could become a mass market device. Conventional caesium clocks use a glass tube containing caesium, which are challenging to make smaller than 1 centimetre (0.39 in). In the CSAC, MEMS techniques were used to create a caesium capsule only 2 cubic millimetres (0.00012 cu in) in size. The light source in conventional atomic clocks is a rubidium atomic-vapor discharge lamp, which was bulky and consumed large amounts of power. In the CSAC this was replaced by an infrared vertical cavity surface emitting laser (VCSEL) fabricated on the chip, with its beam radiating upward into the caesium capsule above it. Another advance was the elimination of the microwave cavity used in conventional clocks, whose size, equal to a wavelength of the microwave frequency, about 3 centimetres (1.2 in), formed the fundamental lower limit to the size of the clock. The cavity was made unnecessary by the use of a quantum technique, coherent population trapping.

== Commercialization ==
The CSAC program achieved a hundredfold size reduction while using 50 times less power than traditional atomic clocks, which led to extensive CSAC use in military and commercial applications. According to an October 2023 report, the CSAC market is expected to grow at a "remarkable" compound annual growth rate (CAGR) from 2023 to 2030. Major commercial vendors include Microsemi (Microchip Technology), Teledyne, and Chengdu Spaceon Electronics.
