= Watch 1505 =

World's first watch

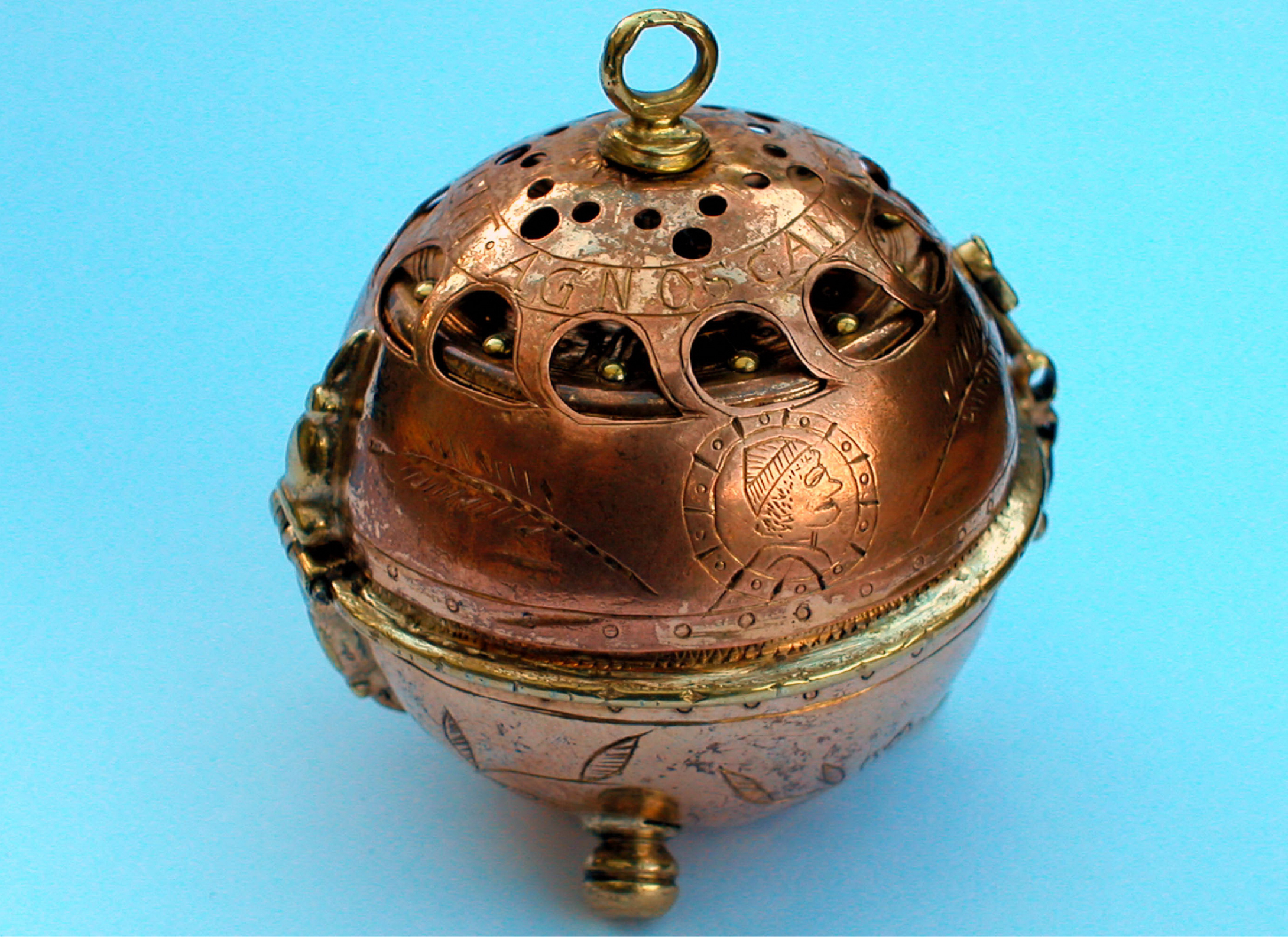
- Watch 1505
- Manufacturer: Peter Henlein
- Display: Analogue
- Introduced: 1505
- Movement: Analogue

The Watch 1505 /ˌwɒtʃ fɪfˈtiːn ˈəʊ ˈfɑːɪv/ (also named PHN1505 or Pomander Watch of 1505) is the world's first watch. It was crafted by the German inventor, locksmith, and watchmaker Peter Henlein from Nuremberg, during the year 1505, in the early German Renaissance period, as part of the Northern Renaissance. However, other German clockmakers were creating miniature timepieces during this period, and there is no definite evidence Henlein was the first. It is the oldest watch in the world that still works. The watch is a small fire-gilded copper sphere, an Oriental pomander, and combines German engineering with Oriental influences. In 1987, the watch reappeared at an antiques and flea market in London. The initial price estimation for this watch is between 50 and 80 million dollars (May 2014).

== History ==
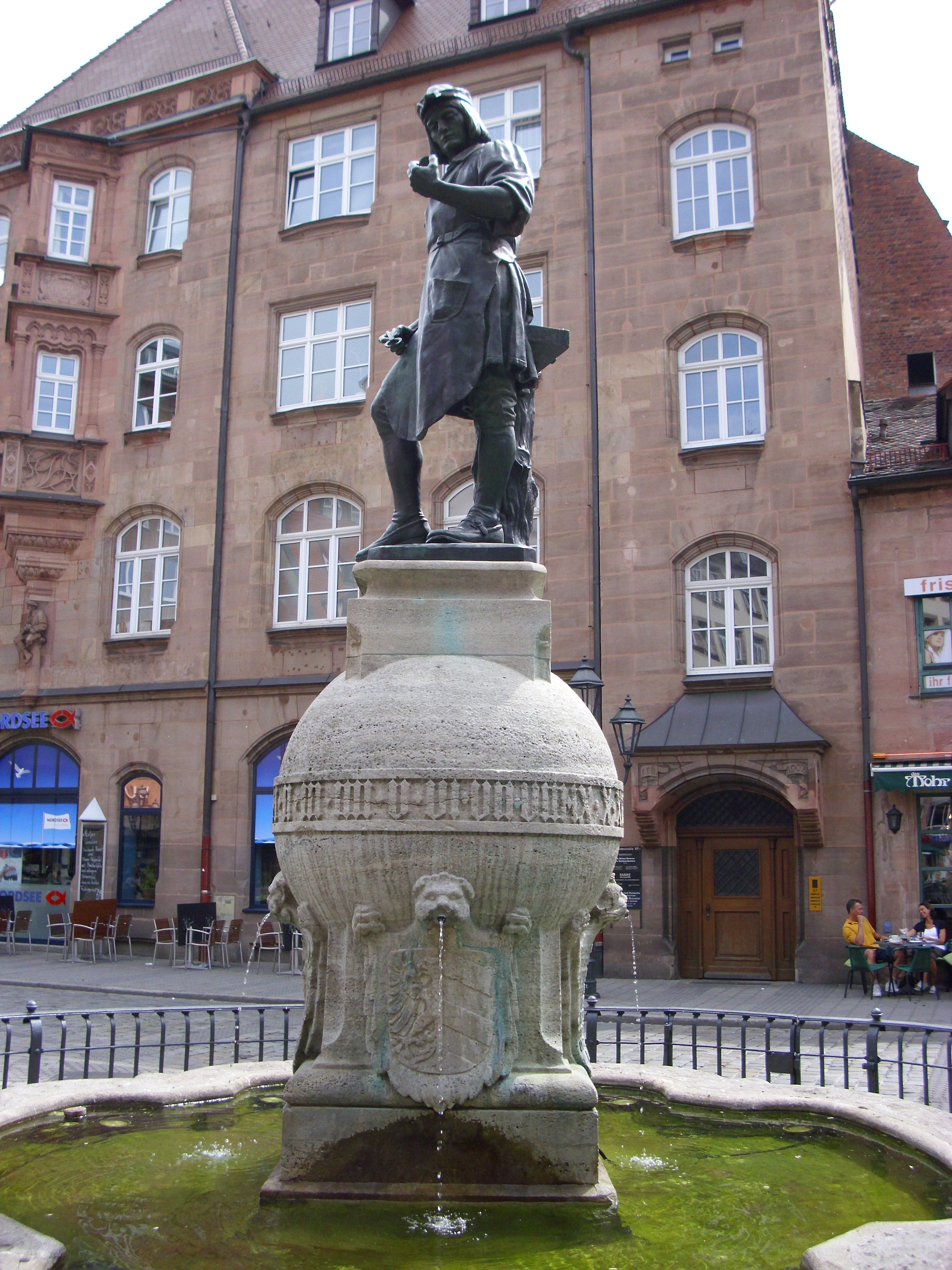
Peter-Henlein-Brunnen (Nuremberg) – built and dedicated in 1905

=== Watch invention ===
The first timepieces to be worn, made in the 16th century initially in the German cities of Nuremberg and Augsburg, were transitional in size between clocks and watches. Portable timepieces were made possible by the invention of the mainspring. Peter Henlein was the first German craftsman to make ornamental timepieces worn as pendants, which were the first timepieces to be worn on the body. His fame (as the inventor of the watch) is based on a passage by Johann Cochläus in 1511. (Note: The translation of Johann Cochläus: Peter Hele, still a young man, fashions works which even the most learned mathematicians admire. He shapes many-wheeled clocks out of small bits of iron, which run and chime the hours without weights for forty hours, whether carried at the breast or in a handbag) Since then, Henlein is generally known as the inventor of the first portable watches. In the early 16th century, he became the first to install small movements in the capsule of a pomander with olfactory essences. In 1505, Peter Henlein of Nuremberg was the first to build the portable pomander watch, the first watch of the world. (Note: No other source can proof an older watch, which was created before - according to older sources, before the watch-reappearance, the previous assumed year of the invention was 1504 or 1510)

The production of this watch was made possible primarily by a previously unseen scale of miniaturization of the torsion pendulum and coil spring mechanism, placed in a technical unit by Peter Henlein, a technological innovation and novelty of the time, operating in all positions.

Henlein created the pomander watch while he lived in the Franciscan Monastery in Nuremberg, where he gained knowledge of the Oriental world gathered over centuries, Henlein acquired the new techniques and tools which helped him creating the first watch in the form of a gilt pomander. (Note: For the assumption that the first watch could have been created during the time of Henlein's stay in the monastery, there is amongst others also the letter of a nun Felicitas Grundherrin as proof. In it, she expressed the wish to have some „orrlei“ [transl.: watch] to be sent to her for pastime.)

In his lifetime, Henlein created other or similar types of watches (e.g., drum watches - the later called the Nuremberg eggs). He also crafted a tower clock for Lichtenau castle in 1541, and was known as a maker of sophisticated scientific instruments.

=== Rediscovery ===
The story of the watch's reappearance began in 1987, at an antique-flea market in London. The watch sequentially changed ownership between collectors who were unaware of its actual worth, until in 2002 a private collector purchased the pomander watch. A committee assessed the watch in 2014, particularly the assertion that the pomander dates back to 1505, and was signed by Henlein himself.

== Aesthetics ==
The design consisted of two small half-spheres, joined by a binding hinge. The upper half of the pomander can be opened to reveal a second – slightly smaller – half-sphere underneath. The top of that inner sphere shows the dial. The upper surface of the dial shows Roman numbers for the first half of the day, and on the outer side of the dial Arabic numerals for the second half of the day. This shows the transition to the new use of numerals at this time in history.

The pomander watch displays small engravings of the city of Nuremberg at the beginning of the 16th century, e. g. the Henkerturm built in the year 1320, which can still be visited today or the still standing Weinstadel. Other symbols are also engraved on the watch, such as sun, serpents or laurels engraved on the watch.

=== Technical description ===
The casing consists of copper, fire gilded on the outside and fire silver-plated on the inside of the watch. Apart from a renewed brass sprocket, the movement is made completely of iron. The detailed dimensions are:

- Casing diameter: 4.15 cm x 4.25 cm (with equator ring 4.5 cm) - Weight 38.5 g
- Movement diameter: 3.60 cm x 3.55 cm - Weight: 54.1 g

A key is used to wind up the watch movement. The Watch 1505 produces a calculated running time of 12 hours.

=== Inscriptions ===
On the watch housing, an old Latin banner is engraved. The inscription is: DVT ME FUGIENT AGNOSCAM R. The possible two translations are:

- 1505 - The time will escape me (Henlein), but I (the watch) will recognize the correct time
- In the year 1505 – My watches will flee (run), and recognize the correct time.

The letters „MDV PHN“ are engraved under the examined silver plating and were found on the inside of the casing underneath the outer face of the clock. The hypothetical indication of the engraving is: 1505 Peter Henlein Nuremberg. Tiny PH-letters, often smaller than half a millimeter, were also found. Peter Henlein was a locksmith and had no qualification as a watchmaker, as there were none (there was no existing occupation or guild). He was not allowed to sign his work officially, as he was not a member of the locksmith's guild. In the early days of watchmaking, locksmiths often were involved in the production as they were accustomed to making small metal components.

=== Symbolism ===
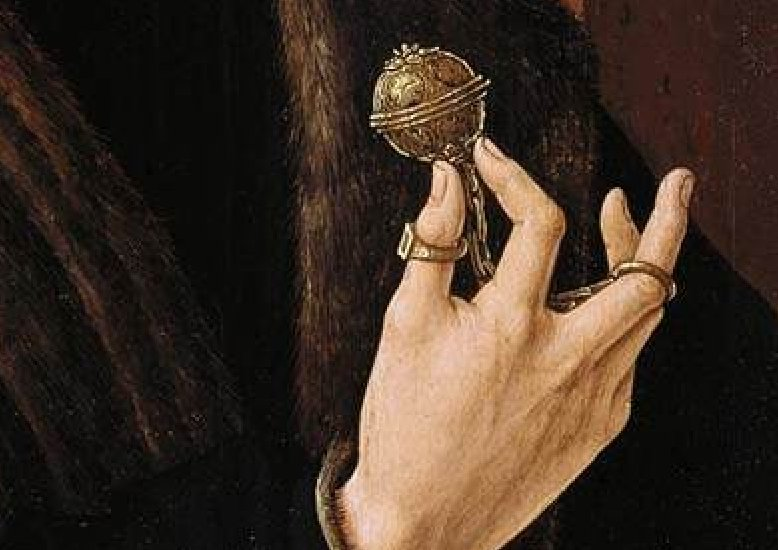
Jan Gerritz van Egmond van de Dijenborgh – cropped painting by Jacob Cornelisz. van Oostsanen, 1518

The Pomander (derived from the French pomme ‘ambre in German Bisamapfel) also called Riechapfel, was a status symbol from the Orient, and often represented first encounter by the Europeans with the fragrances of the Orient. It became as a valued symbolic gift of diplomatic exchange between leading personalities in from the East to the West, and was believed to have a healing and protective effect. For example Jacob Cornelisz. van Oostsanen created 1518 a portrait of Jan Gerritz van Egmond van de Dijenborgh, the elected major of Alkmaar, in 1518, with a pomander in his hand. The pomander form was spread in the Middle Ages from the Orient throughout Europe. The watch itself can be seen as a cultural encounter between the European engineering and the Oriental form. Pomanders were worn due to the poor hygienic conditions in the cities. The musk-perfume inside the pomander had a disinfectant and odor resistant effect.

== Financial worth ==
A paper from 1524 records that Heinlein was paid 15 florins (one florin is approximately between 140 and 1000 modern US dollars) for a gilt pomander watch. The initial price estimation is around 50 - 80 million dollars, according to the AntiqueWeek magazine (May 2014).

== Examinations and confirmation ==
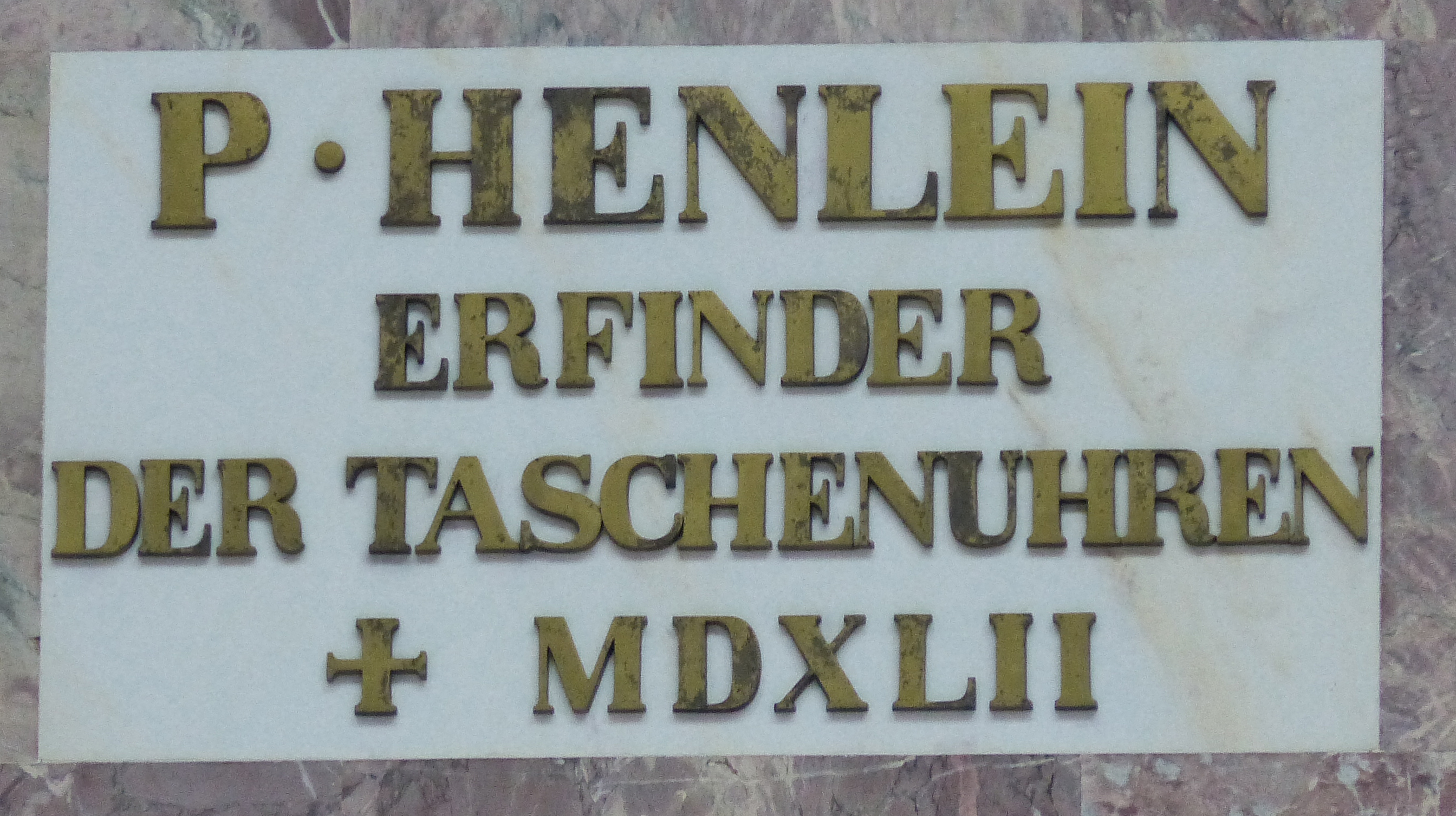
Peter Henlein - Inventor of the watch - Walhalla memorial

Several examinations (micro- and macro-photographic and metallurgical examinations, as well as a 3D computer tomography) were made to proof the authenticity of the watch. The general examinations-result showed that the pomander watch was created by Henlein in the year 1505.

There is also a confirmation of the date of invention, verifying that the engravings lie beneath under the layer of a medieval method of fire gilding. The invention was celebrated at the 400th anniversary of the German Watchmakers’ Association in 1905. On this occasion, a monument fountain dedicated to Peter Henlein was built in Nuremberg.

Also Johann Neudörfers also wrote in 1547 that Henlein invented the pomander watches (die bisam Köpf zu machen erfunden). (Note: Original quote from Neudörfers 1547: (...) so die kleinen Uhrlein in die Bisam Köpf zu machen erfunden - translated: so invented the little clock to make the muskrat head)

The Walhalla in Donaustauf, which is a memorial for "politicians, sovereigns, scientists and artists of the German tongue", honors Peter Henlein with the words inventor of the watch. (Note: Original words (Walhalla memorial): Erfinder der Sackuhren, Adalbert Müller wrote additionally 1884: Seines Zeichens ein Schlosser, wohnhaft in der seit Jahrhunderten durch Bewerbsamkeit und Erfindungsgeist sich hervortuhenden Stadt Nürnberg)

== Other pomander watches by Peter Henlein ==
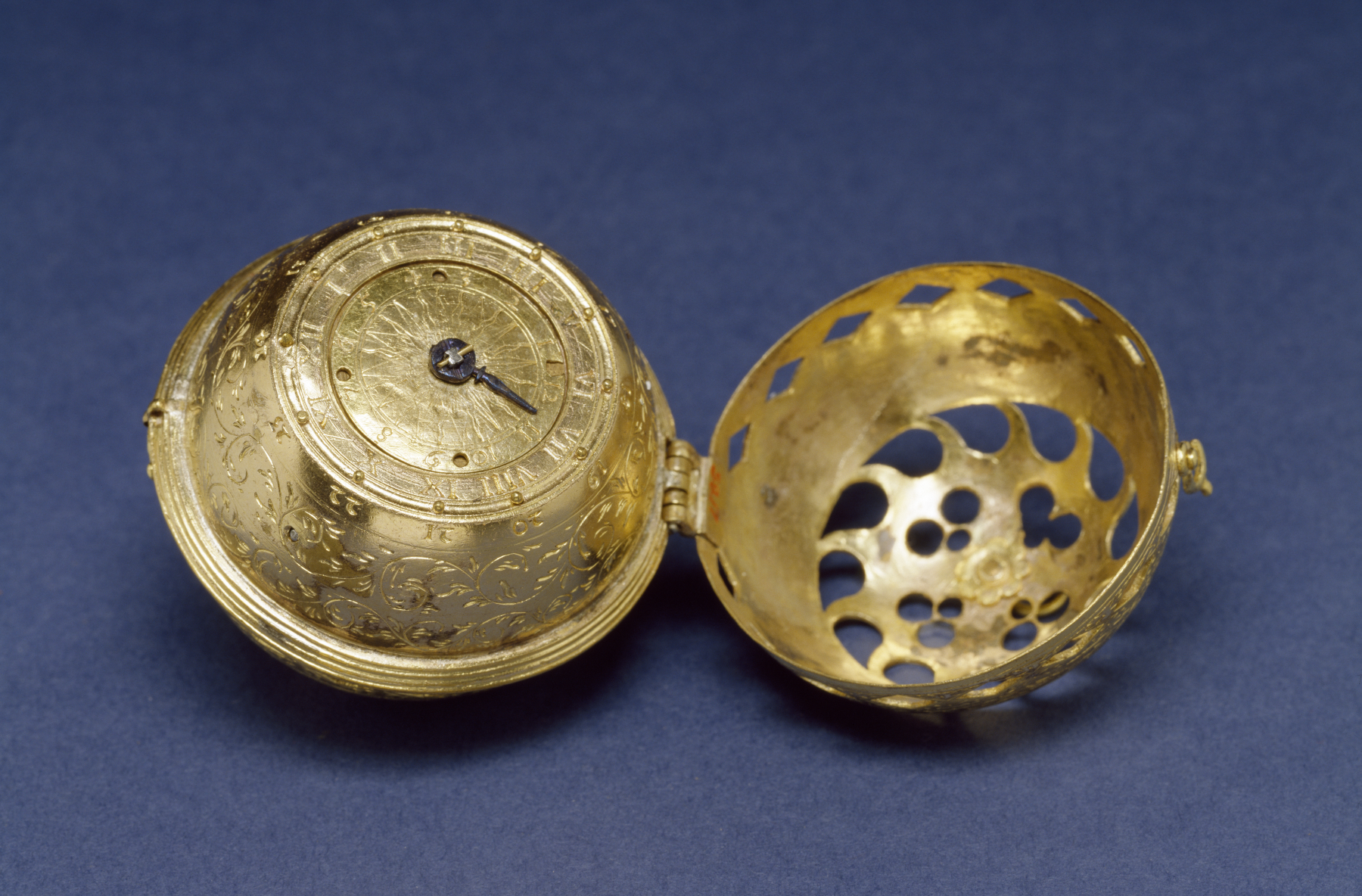
The other pomander watch (1530) created by Peter Henlein. It once belonged to Philip Melanchthon and is now in the Walters Art Museum, Baltimore

Nowadays, there are only two preserved pomander watches in the world. The one from 1505 is in private ownership, and the Pomander Watch of Melanchthon, from 1530, which is owned by the Walters Art Museum in Baltimore. It was most probably a gift by the City of Nuremberg, to the Nuremberg Reformer Philipp Melanchthon and Peter Henlein was commissioned to create this personalized watch. Also an empty housing of a pomander watch can be found at the Wuppertal Watch Museum.

The former watchmaker and art collector Jürgen Abeler from the Wuppertaler Watch Museum concludes about pomander watches in his book: „So if any one of the preserved watches at all should be linked with the person of Peter Henlein, it can only be this watch in the pomander.“

== See also ==
- Nuremberg eggs
- History of watches
- History of timekeeping devices
- List of German inventions and discoveries
- German Renaissance

== Literature ==
- Ernst von Bassermann-Jordan: Alte Uhren und Ihre Meister, page 47 - 51, publisher: Wilhelm Diebener Leipzig, 1926. German, ISBN 3766704346
- Catherine Cardinal: Die Zeit an der Kette, page 16, publisher: Klinkhardt & Biermann Munich, 1985. German, ISBN 3781402541
- Thomas Eser: Die älteste Taschenuhr der Welt?, publisher: Verlag des Germanischen Nationalmuseums, 2014. German, ISBN 3781402541
- Samuel Guye, Henri Michael: Uhren und Messinstrumente, Orell Füssli Verlag Zürich, 1970. German, ISBN 3894872608
- Maren Winter: Die Stunden der Sammler, Heyne, 2004. German, ISBN 9783548602240
- Jürgen Abeler: In Sachen Peter Henlein, Wuppertaler Uhrenmuseum, Wuppertal 1980. German, ISBN 9783923422234
- Walter Spiegel: Taschenuhren, Mosaik, Munich 1981. German, ISBN 3570055345
- Hans Dominik: Das ewige Herz - Meister Peter Henleins Nürnberger Oerlein, Wilhelm Lippert Berlin, 1942. German, ISBN 9783548360003
- Thomas Eser: Die älteste Taschenuhr der Welt? Der Henlein-Uhrenstreit. Nürnberg 2014. German, ISBN 9783936688924 (Digitalisat)
