= Peter Henlein =

German locksmith & clockmaker

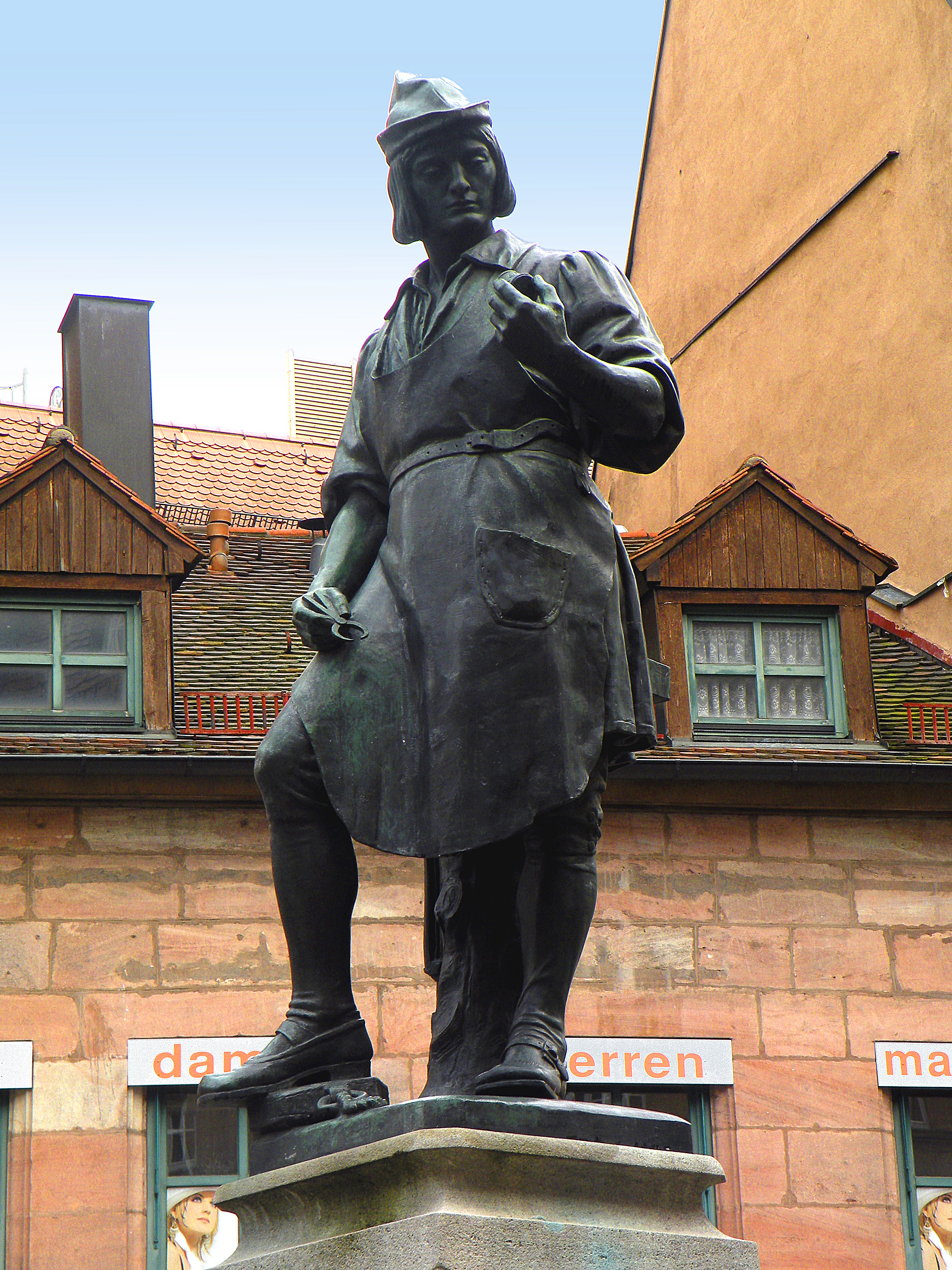
- Peter Henlein
- Born: 23 August 1485; Nuremberg
- Died: 1542 (aged 56–57); Nuremberg
- Monuments: Hefnersplatz (Nuremberg), by Max Meißner (1905)
- Other names: Peter Hele, Peter Henle
- Occupations: master locksmith, clockmaker, watchmaker
- Era: German Renaissance
- Known for: Inventor of the watch
- Spouse(s): Kundigunde Ernst, (first wife) Maragarete (second wife) Walburga Schreyer (Third wife)
- Parents: Peter Henlein (father); Barbara Henlein (mother)
- Family: Herman Henlein (older brother)

Peter Henlein (also spelled Henle or Hele) (1485–August 1542) was a German locksmith, clockmaker and watchmaker from Nuremberg. He is often credited with inventing the pocket watch, particularly in connection with the fire-gilded pomander-shaped watch from 1505. He was among the first craftsmen to make small portable spring-driven clocks, worn as pendants, or attached to clothing, that are regarded as the earliest watches. Some popular accounts also credit Henlein with inventing the mainspring, although this fact is disputed.

== Life ==
Henlein grew up in Nuremberg. His parents were Peter, a brass forger and citizen of Nuremberg since 1461, and Barbara Henlein. He had one older brother, Herman Henlein, who became also a master cutler in 1496. In his life he was married to three women: Kunigunde Ernst, his first wife, and Margarethe, his second, and Walburga Schreyer, his third wife.

He apparently apprenticed in his youth as a locksmith. At the time, locksmiths were among the few craftsmen with the skills and tools to enter the new field of clockmaking.

On September 7, 1504, he was involved in a brawl in which a fellow locksmith, Georg Glaser, was killed. As one of the accused he asked for and received asylum in the Franciscan Monastery of Nuremberg, where he lived until 1508. This monastery had a history as a center of scientific and astronomical knowledge. During his asylum he may have gained deeper knowledge of the craft of clockmaking there.

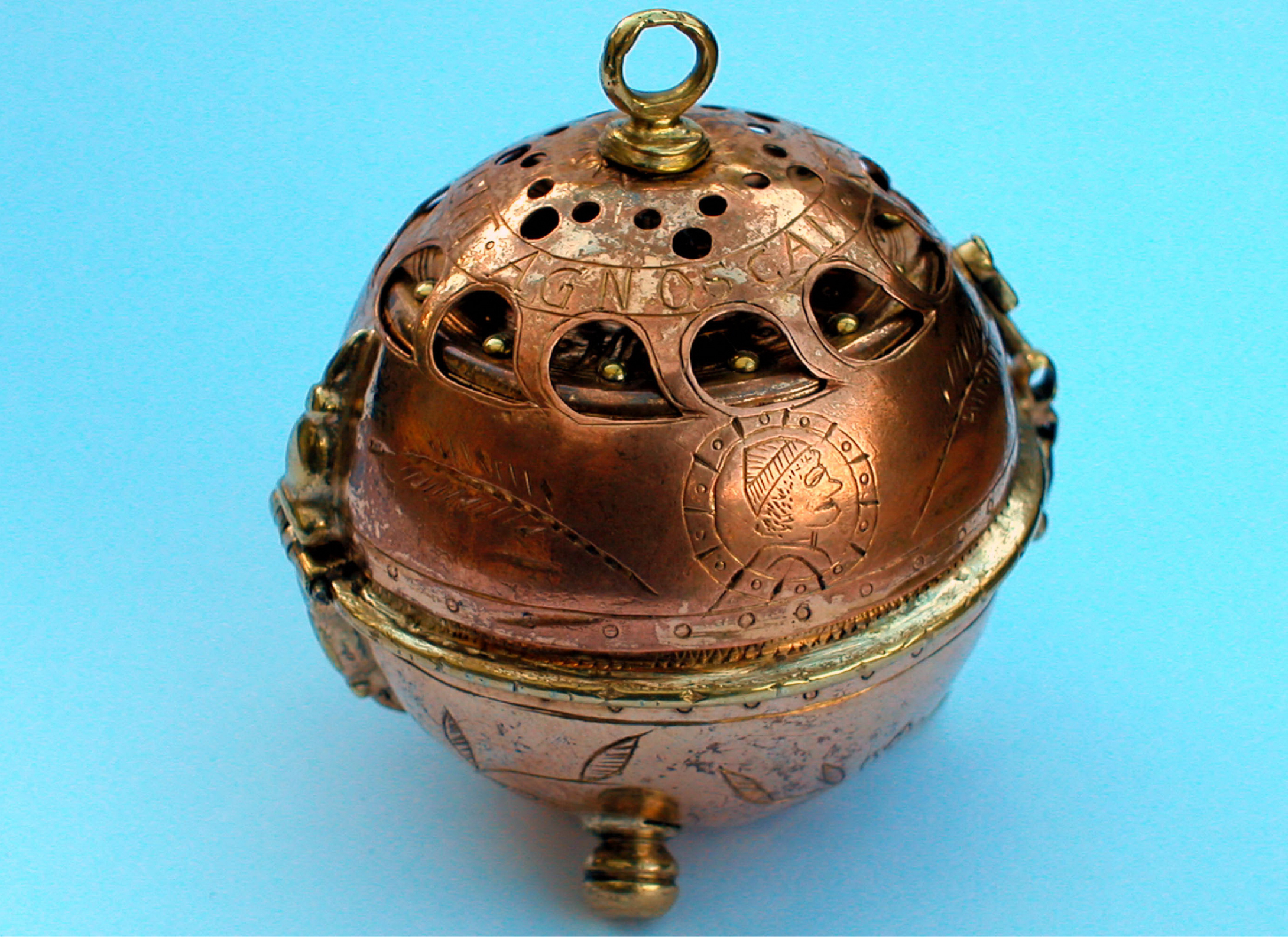
Fire-gilded pomander watch from 1505 probably made by Henlein, one of the earliest existing examples of a watch

Henlein became known as a maker of small portable ornamental spring-powered brass clocks, very rare and expensive, which were fashionable among the nobility of the time, worn as pendants or attached to clothing, which can be considered the first watches. He was known as the first craftsman to build clockworks into "Bisamköpfe", musk-balls or pomanders, small pendant containers fashioned from precious metals for fragrances or disinfectants; these are now known as pomander watches. In November 1509, he became a master in the city's locksmith guild. He is mentioned in the city's records as the supplier of these small clocks, which were given as gifts to important people. The earliest extant example of a watch, the Watch 1505, a fire-gilded pomander watch dated 1505, has been attributed to Henlein.

In 1529, Henlein traveled to Strasbourg on behalf of the Nuremberg council, for a sky globe. Six years later, he crafted a watch for the council of Nuremberg. He also built a tower clock for Lichtenau castle in 1541, and was known as a builder of advanced astronomical instruments.

Henlein died in August 1542 and was buried at the Katharinenkirche, Nuremberg.

== Recognition ==
The first and most important historical tribute of Peter Henlein and his invention of a portable watch was made in 1511 by an influential figure of the time. Johannes Cochläus, humanist and contemporary of Peter Henlein, he wrote in the appendix of the description of the world “Cosmographia Pomponius Mela – De Norimberga Germania Centro”, which is dedicated to the humanist of the Renaissance Willibald Pirckheimer, a eulogy to the City of Nuremberg, including a praise for Peter Henlein and his watches: (Note: "Inveniuntin dies subtiliora. Etenim Petrus Hele, juvenis adhuc admodum, opera efficit, que vel doctissimi admirantur mathematici, nam ex fero parvo fabricat horologia plurimis digesta rotulis, que quocumque vertantur absque ullo pondere et monstrant et pulsant XL horas, etiamsi in sinu marsupiove contineantur")

“Every day they (the craftsmen of Nuremberg) invent finer things. For example, Peter Hele (Henlein), still a young man, fashions works that even the most learned mathematicians admire: for from only a little bit of iron he makes clocks with many wheels, which, no matter how one might turn them, show and chime the hours for forty hours without any weight, even when carried at the breast or in a handbag (purse).”

Johann Neudörfers wrote in 1547 that Henlein invented the portable pomander watches (die bisam Köpf zu machen erfunden). (Note: Original quote from Neudörfers 1547: (...) so die kleinen Uhrlein in die Bisam Köpf zu machen erfunden - translated: so invented the little clock to make the muskrat head)

In his lifetime, Henlein crafted many watches and instruments. A paper from 1524 records that Heinlein was paid 15 florins (one florin is approximately between 140 and 1000 modern US dollars) for a gilt pomander watch. His customers included the high society of the 16th century, f. e. Martin Luther, Kaspar von Schöneich (chancellor of Mecklenburg), Frederick III, Elector of Saxony, Kardinal Albrecht from Brandenburg, Philip Melanchthon, Mercurino di Gattinara as well as gifts which were given by the Nuremberg Council.

=== Commemoration ===
In 1905, the German Watchmakers’ Association and the City of Nuremberg celebrated the 400th anniversary of the invention of the pocket watch. A watch exhibition was held in Nuremberg during the celebrations, at which outstanding works were awarded Henlein medals.

The Peter Henlein Fountain was unveiled on the occasion of the opening of the watch exhibition in. The fountain was donated by the City of Nuremberg and the watchmakers’ association. Inscription: ‘IN MEMORY OF THE INVENTOR OF THE POCKET WATCH PETER HENLEIN FROM THE CITY OF NUREMBERG AND THE GERMAN WATCHMAKERS ASSOCIATION’.

His fame as the inventor of the watch came after his rise to popular consciousness in the 19th century, through a novel by Karl Spindler, Der Nürnberger Sophokles. This was made into a book and the 1939 film called "The Immortal Heart". Also in 1942, Germany dedicated a stamp with the words: Peter Henlein - Inventor of the Watch (Peter Henlein - Erfinder der Taschenuhr).

Much earlier, the Walhalla in Donaustauf, which is a memorial for "politicians, sovereigns, scientists and artists of the German tongue", honors Peter Henlein in 1842, at its inauguration with the words inventor of the pocket watch. By coincidence, it was the 300th anniversary of his death. (Note: Original words (Walhalla memorial): Erfinder der Sackuhren, Adalbert Müller wrote additionally 1884: Seines Zeichens ein Schlosser, wohnhaft in der seit Jahrhunderten durch Bewerbsamkeit und Erfindungsgeist sich hervortuhenden Stadt Nürnberg)

Walhalla memorial

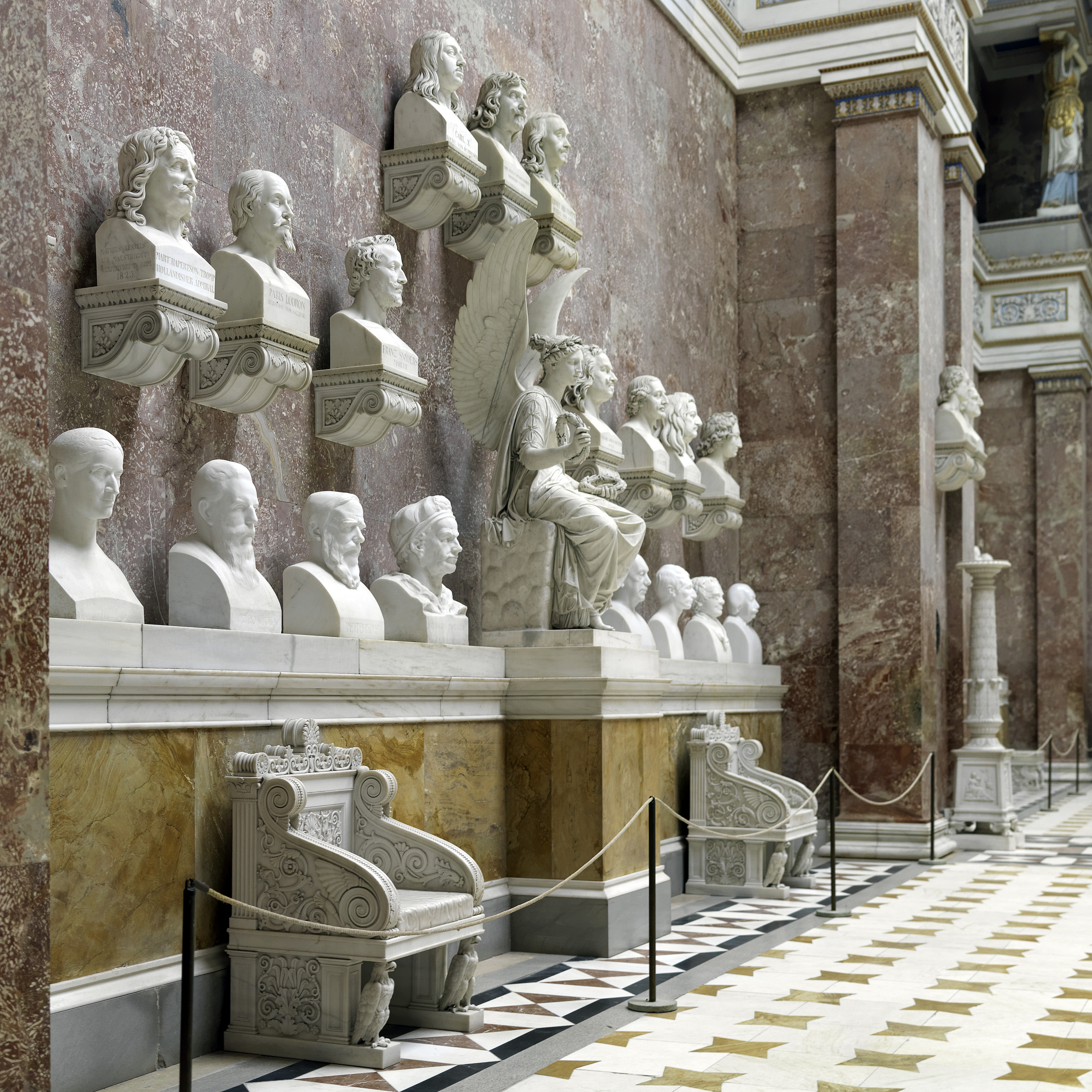

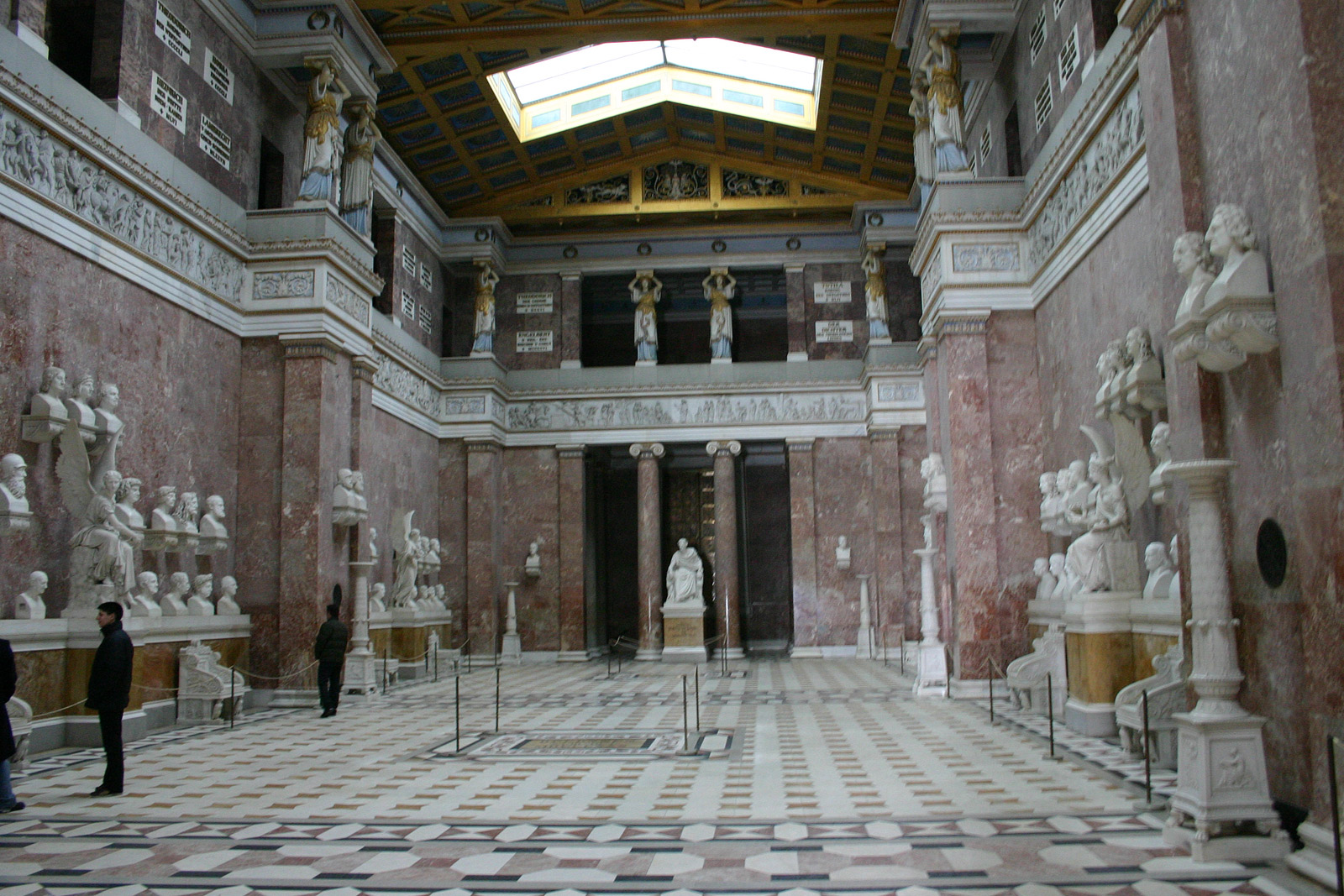

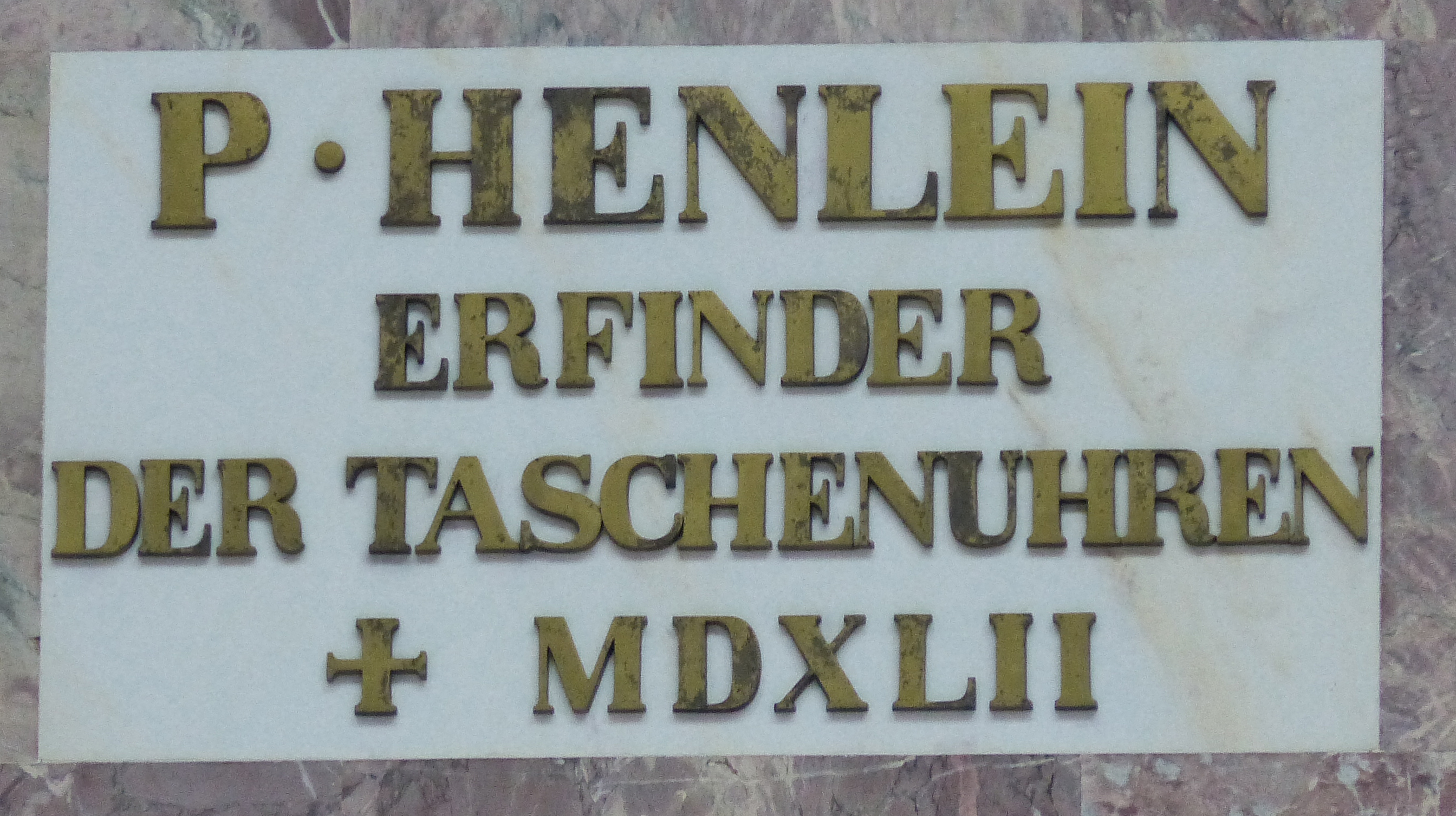

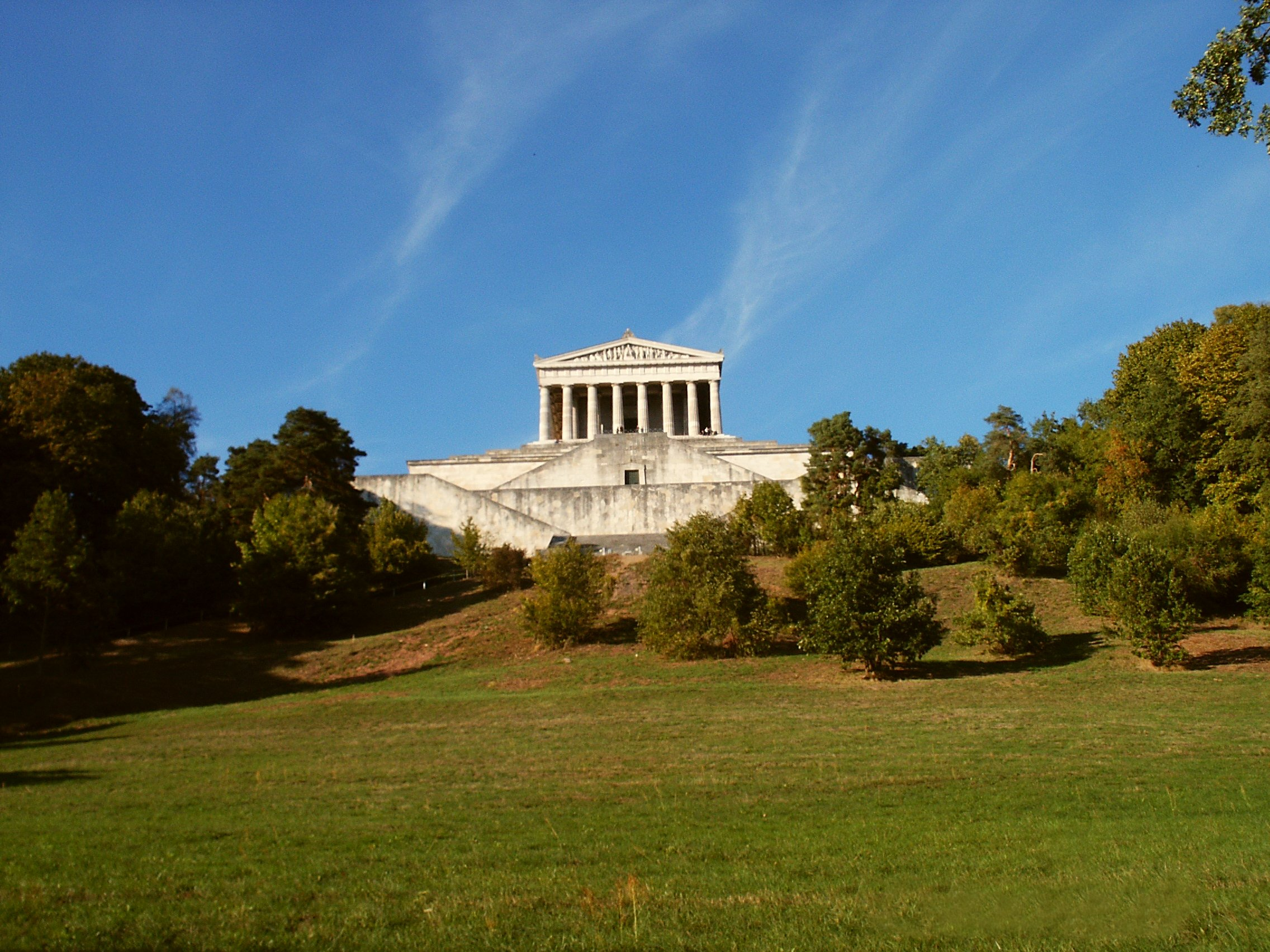

=== Mainspring ===
The mainspring which made portable clocks possible, often attributed to him, actually appeared in the early 15th century, almost a century before his work. Although he did not invent the mainspring, the production of his portable watches was made possible primarily by a previously unseen scale of miniaturization of the torsion pendulum and coil spring mechanism, placed in a technical unit by Peter Henlein, a technological innovation and novelty of the time, operating in all positions; which makes him to the inventor of the watch.

=== Pomander watch and Nuremberg eggs ===
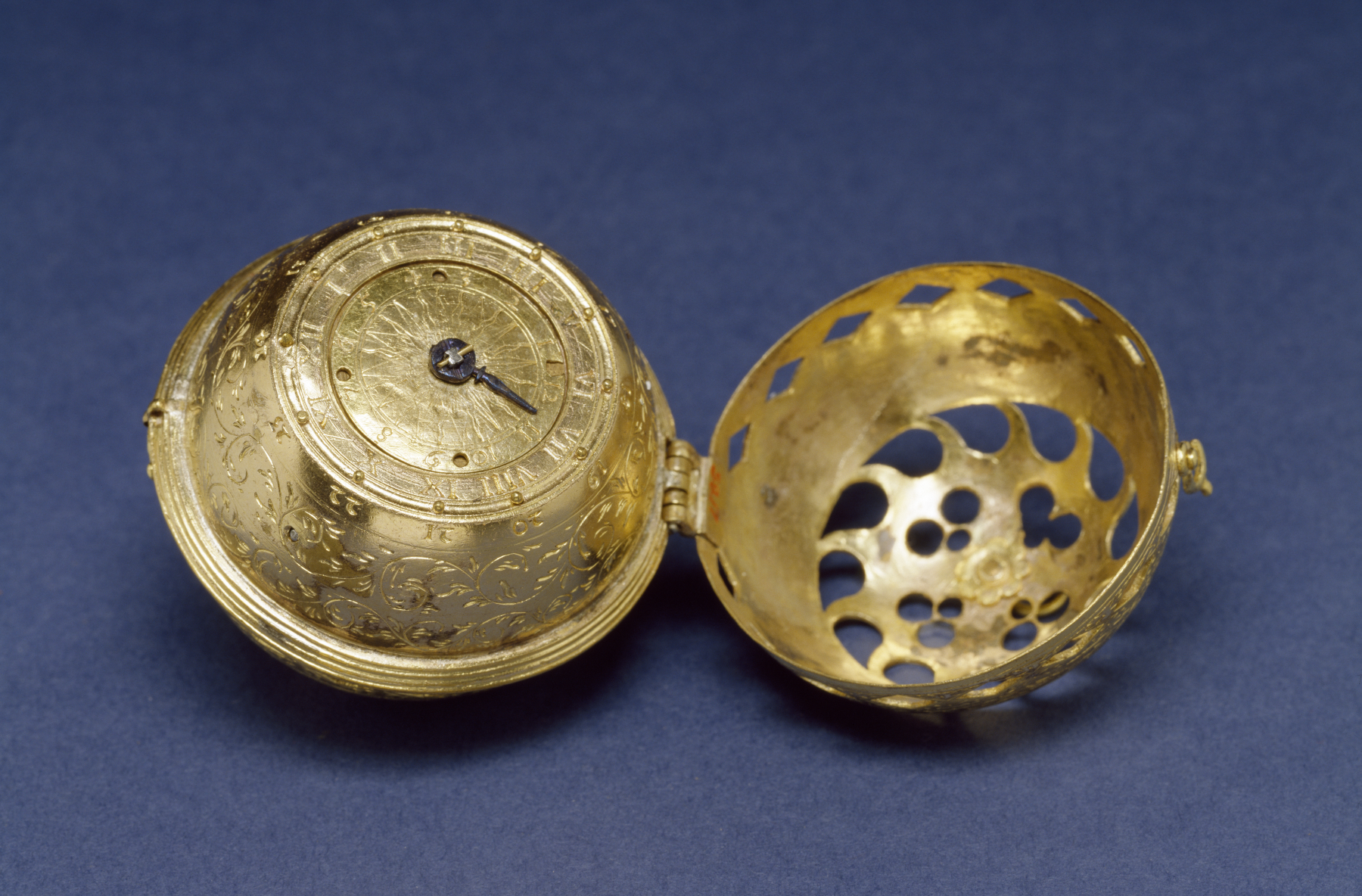
Pomander Watch 1530 created by Peter Henlein. It once belonged to Philip Melanchthon and is now in the Walters Art Museum, Baltimore.

Henlein did not create the typical Nuremberg eggs - he crafted mainly portable pomander watches. Although they are associated with Henlein, and are a development of the watch-making tradition of Henlein's time, they thus become popular only several decades after his death.

The German word Eierlein "little egg" is a corruption of a diminutive of Uhr (Middle Low German ûr, from Latin hora) "clock", Aeurlein or Ueurlein (Modern German Ührlein). The association with "eggs" may arise with a 1571 translation of Rabelais by Johann Fischart in 1571; Fischart translated as Eierlein an instance of Ueurlein in Rabelais. This form of the name may have played a part in inspiring the oval shape becoming popular in the 1580s.

The former watchmaker and art collector Jürgen Abeler from the Wuppertaler Watch Museum concludes about pomander watches in his book: "So if any one of the preserved watches at all should be linked with the person of Peter Henlein, it can only be this watch in the pomander."

== Inspirational period and environment ==
A well-known saying at the time of the Holy Roman Empire positioned the various different European centres of the early Renaissance age, including Nuremberg's special atmosphere:

“If I had Venice's power, Augsburg's splendour, Nuremberg's esprit, Strasburg's weapons and Ulm's money, I would be the richest man in the world.” Nuremberg's esprit was a reference to its openness to innovation and invention. (Note: Popular quote from that time in German: Hätt ich Venedigs Macht und Augsburger Pracht, Nürnberger Witz, Straßburger Geschütz und Ulmer Geld, wär ich der Reichste in der Welt.)

As a citizen of Nuremberg, Peter Henlein had the privilege of living in the midst of this intellectual atmosphere. The development of his work craftsmanship was based on the development of metalwork and mechanics in Nuremberg.The atmosphere of the European Renaissance and the Renaissance city of Nuremberg was shaped by the many cultural influences affecting it

Peter Henlein most likely procured this Oriental pomander in the monastery. The plague had descended on Nuremberg in 1505 and the pomander as status symbol had returned to the awareness of many of his high-ranking contemporaries. In an age of new perspectives, it must have been very tempting to place the essence or spirit of time in the container of a fragrance dispenser.

== Popular culture ==
Henlein made an appearance in the 2022 Improv Guys novella History Crusaders as one of the main characters.

== See also ==
- Watch 1505
- Nuremberg eggs
- Watch
- History of watches
- History of timekeeping devices
- List of German inventions and discoveries
- Pomander

== Literature ==
- Ernst von Bassermann-Jordan: Alte Uhren und Ihre Meister, page 47 - 51, publisher: Wilhelm Diebener Leipzig, 1926. German, ISBN 3766704346
- Catherine Cardinal: Die Zeit an der Kette, page 16, publisher: Klinkhardt & Biermann Munich, 1985. German, ISBN 3781402541
- Samuel Guye, Henri Michael: Uhren und Messinstrumente, Orell Füssli Verlag Zürich, 1970. German, ISBN 3894872608
- Maren Winter: Die Stunden der Sammler, Heyne, 2004. German, ISBN 9783548602240
- Jürgen Abeler In Sachen Peter Henlein. Wuppertaler Uhrenmuseum, Wuppertal 1980
- Maren Winter Der Stundensammler. Wilhelm Heyne Verlag, München 2004 (Roman), ISBN 3-453-40146-8,1510: Peter Henlein invents the pocket watch
- Thomas Eser Die Henlein-Ausstellung im Germanischen Nationalmuseum - Rueckblick, Ausblick, neue Funde. A scholarly Essay in: Jahresschrift 2015 - Deutsche Gesellschaft fuer Chronometrie -Band 54, Seite 23–44. Published by Deutsche Gesellschaft fuer Chronometrie, Nuernberg, ISBN 978-3-923422-23-4
