= Nuremberg eggs =

Small ornamental spring-driven clock

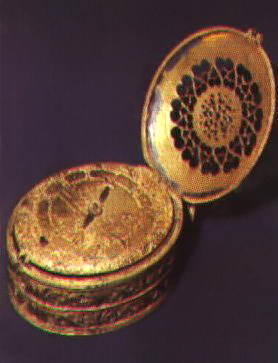
A Nuremberg egg watch of the late 16th century

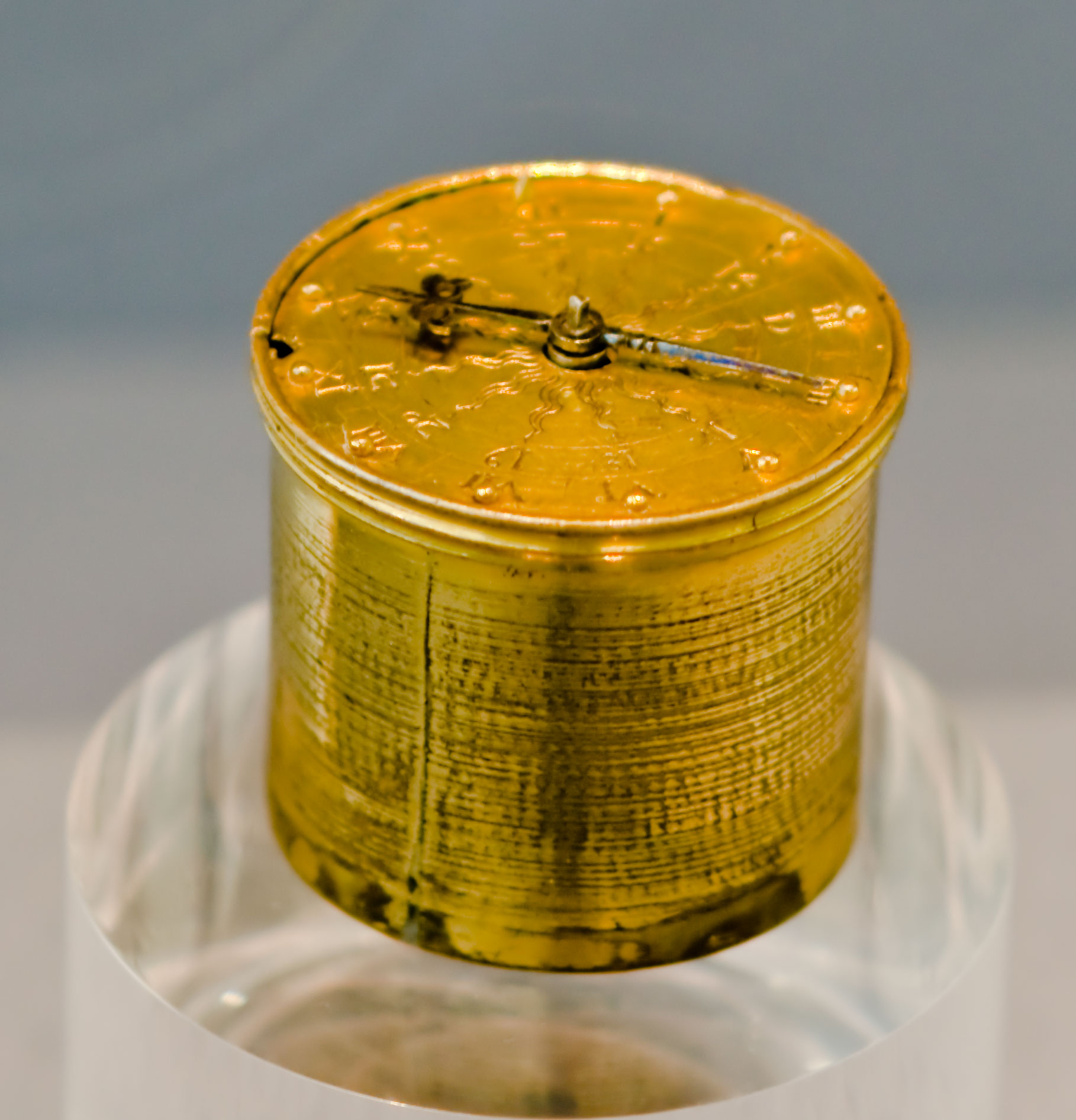
The oldest Nuremberg "clock-watch" preserved dates to c. 1550, after Henlein's death. Kept in Germanisches Nationalmuseum, this is the so-called "Henlein-Uhr", and its association with Henlein's workshop, and even its authenticity, has long been controversial.

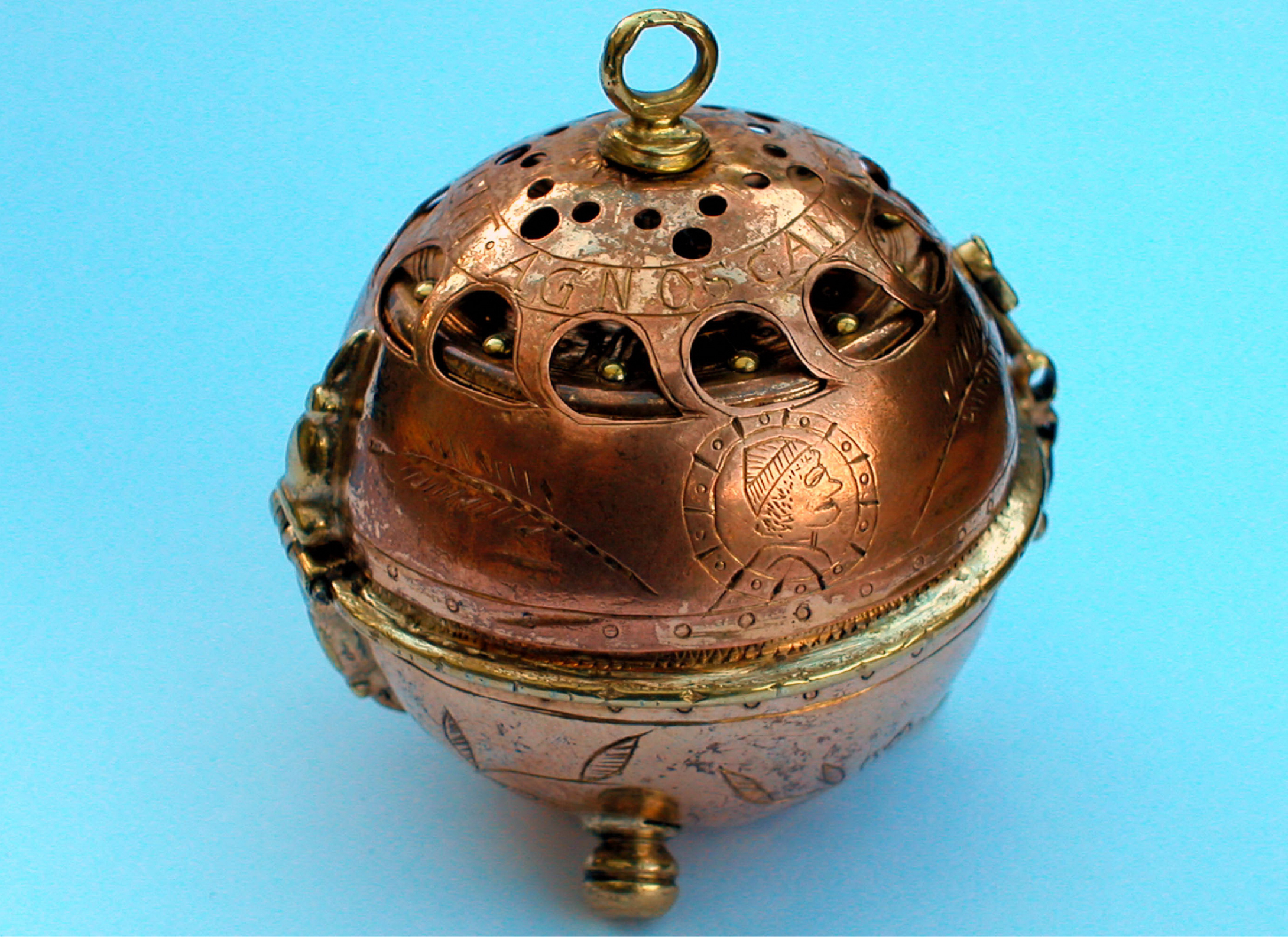
The 1505 pomander watch

A Nuremberg egg (German: Nürnberger Ei) is a type of small ornamental spring-driven clock made to be worn around the neck, produced in Nuremberg in the mid-to-late 16th century.

Their production was made possible by the miniaturisation of the torsion pendulum and coil spring mechanism by Nuremberg clockmaker Peter Henlein (d. 1542) at the beginning of the 16th century (c. 1505–10). These portable watches were a novelty (although the oldest portable watch driven by wound-up clockwork rather than by weights dates to c. 1430, the so-called watch of Philip the Good), and their accuracy was very limited, so that they only had a single hand, showing hours.

There are three types of clock-watches made in early 16th-century Nuremberg:

- High cylindrical drum-watches (Dosenuhr) to be used as table clocks or to be carried in a purse
- Flat cylindrical drum-watches (Dosenuhr) to be worn around the neck on a cord or necklace
- Spherical watches in small pomanders (Bisamapfeluhr) that were worn on the wrist or around the neck

The actual "eggs" (Eierlein) are a type of oval ("egg-shaped") form of the Dosenuhr which became popular from around 1580. Although they are associated with Henlein, and are a development of the watch-making tradition of Henlein's time, they thus become popular only several decades after his death. The German name Eierlein "little egg" is a corruption of a diminutive of Uhr (Middle Low German ûr, from Latin hora) "clock", Aeurlein or Ueurlein (Modern German Ührlein). The association with "eggs" may arise with a 1571 translation of Rabelais by Johann Fischart in 1571; Fischart translated as Eierlein an instance of Ueurlein in Rabelais. This form of the name may have played a part in inspiring the oval shape becoming popular in the 1580s.

It is known that Henlein first succeeded in producing a portable clock in 1510, and his contributions were clearly instrumental in giving rise to the later Nuremberg "neck-watch" industry. He is recorded to have sold a "gilded Pomander for all purposes with a clock-mechanism" (vergulten pysn Apffel für all Ding mit einem Oraiologium, i.e. a clock built into a precious perfume-box) for 15 gulden to the city on 11 January 1524. Of the "pomander watch" type (Bisamapfeluhr), only two specimens are known to survive, one dated to 1505 and attributed to Henlein, the other dated 1530 (Walters Art Museum, Baltimore).

== In media ==
In the TV series Maria Theresia, one of Maria Theresia's commanders sends her a Nuremberg egg to let her know that he has taken a city.
