= Auction Technology Group =

British trade magazine for art and antiques

Metropress Limited
- Trade name: Auction Technology Group
- Type: Public
- Traded as: LSE: ATG
- Industry: Publishing
- Founded: 1971; 55 years ago
- Headquarters: London, England, United Kingdom
- Key people: Breon Corcoran (Chairman); Duncan Painter (CEO)
- Revenue: ▲£190.2 million (2025)
- Operating income: ▼£(134.2) million (2025)
- Net income: ▼£(144.6) million (2025)
- Website: auctiontechnologygroup.com

Antiques Trade Gazette
- Editor: Noelle McElhatton
- Former editors: Mark Bridge, Ivan Macquisten
- Categories: Antiques
- Frequency: Weekly
- Publisher: Auction Technology Group
- Founder: Ivor Turnbull
- First issue: September 1971
- Country: United Kingdom
- Based in: London
- Language: English
- Website: antiquestradegazette.com

Metropress Limited, trading as Auction Technology Group, is a digital marketplace business. It also publishes Antiques Trade Gazette which is a London-based weekly publication and website serving the art and antiques community and was the original genesis of the business but is now a small proportion of the group’s revenues. The print publication has around 16,000 subscribers (2015). It is listed on the London Stock Exchange and is a constituent of the FTSE 250 Index.

== History ==
Antiques Trade Gazette was founded in September 1971 in London by journalist Ivor Turnbull, previously diarist at the Evening Standard and editor of Art and Antiques Weekly. It provided a calendar of art and antiques sales, and was initially resented by many antique dealers keen to protect their favourite country sales. However, it eventually became an essential tool of the trade - being described by the Burlington Magazine as the "acknowledged 'Bible' of the fine art and antiques industry".

The Gazette's publisher, Metropress, was acquired by the Daily Mail and General Trust in 1994. The company adapted to the internet, creating the-saleroom.com, before, in 2006, launching a live bidding platform, the latest step in its transition from print to an internet offering. In October 2008, when the business had 53 staff and a turnover of £6 million, it was the subject of a management buyout backed by private equity house Matrix (today Mobeus Equity Partners). The deal also saw the company divest three US-based publications AntiqueWeek, AntiqueWest and Auction Exchange.

From 15 percent of sales at the time of the MBO in 2008, the-saleroom.com revenues accounted for 45 per cent of the business's £8.9 million turnover by 2012. The company offered its antique bidding platform to publishers in Germany and France, and invested in China’s live auction site, epai.hk. It also established a separate auction site, ibidder.com, focused on industrial equipment.

Private equity firm ECI Partners invested in the business in 2014, by which time the website sold £68.3 million of art and antiques, while ibidder.com saw sales worth £39.4m, generating revenues of over £15 million. The company renamed itself from ATG Media to Auction Technology Group in November 2016. TA Associates acquired a majority stake in the company in February 2020 with existing investor, ECI Partners, reinvesting from its latest fund and holding a minority stake.

On 8 February 2021, the company, chaired by Breon Corcoran, announced plans to float on the London Stock Exchange through an IPO in March 2021.

== Editors of Antiques Trade Gazette ==
- Ivor Turnbull 1971-1994 (Turnbull died in November 1995, and was commemorated by the creation of the Antique Trade Gazette's Ivor Turnbull Memorial Prizes)
- Mark Bridge 1994-2000
- Ivan Macquisten 2000-2015
- Noelle McElhatton 2015–2018
