= AntiqueWeek =

American antiques newspaper

- Type: Antiques
- Owner(s): MidCountry Media, Inc.
- Founded: 1968
- Language: English
- Circulation: 70,000 weekly readers

AntiqueWeek is one of the most popular antiques newspapers in the United States and has been a source for weekly antiques and collectibles news in the United States since 1968. AntiqueWeek has a weekly circulation of over 70,000 readers.

The newspaper was purchased by the startup company, MidCountry Media, Inc. in September 2009. The publication had previously been a sister title of the UK's Antiques Trade Gazette, but in October 2008, the publisher was the subject of a management buyout during which it divested three related US-based publications including AntiqueWeek.

== Editions ==
The Eastern edition covers the states east of Ohio and the Central edition covers the mid-western states west of Pennsylvania. AntiqueWest covers states in the Western United States. Each edition includes a National section which concentrates on industry news and major auctions around the country. The published rate, as of January 1, 2006, for a one-year subscription to AntiqueWeek is 41 USD.

Capsule summaries from around the country appear in every issue of their respective regional editions in the AntiqueWeek Auction Roundup. Important issues in the auction industry are discussed in Auction Time, a weekly column by auctioneer and attorney Steve Proffitt. Additional commentary is provided by editors and columnists. AntiqueWeek's Managing Editor is Connie Swaim.
