= Pomander =

Ball or container of herbs and perfumes

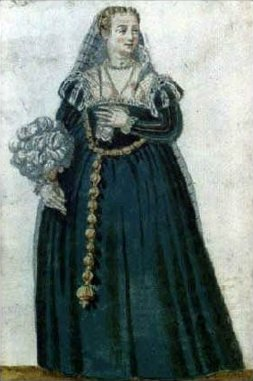
Venetian woman with a pomander

A pomander, from French pomme d'ambre, i.e., apple of amber, is a ball made for perfumes, such as ambergris (hence the name), musk, or civet. The pomander was worn or carried in a case as a protection against infection in times of pestilence or merely as a useful article to mask bad smells. The globular cases which contained the pomanders were hung from a neck-chain or belt or attached to the girdle, and were usually perforated in a variety of openwork techniques and made of gold or silver. Sometimes they contained several partitions, in each of which was placed a different perfume.

The term "pomander" can refer to the scented material itself or to the container that contains such material. The container could be made of gold, silver or other materials and eventually evolved to be shaped like nuts, skulls, hearts, books, and ships. Smaller versions were made to be attached by a chain to a finger ring and held in the hand. Even smaller versions served as cape buttons or rosary beads.

A pomander can be a bag containing fragrant herbs and might be viewed as an early form of aromatherapy. Pomanders can be considered related to censers, in which aromatics are burned or roasted rather than naturally evaporated.

== History ==
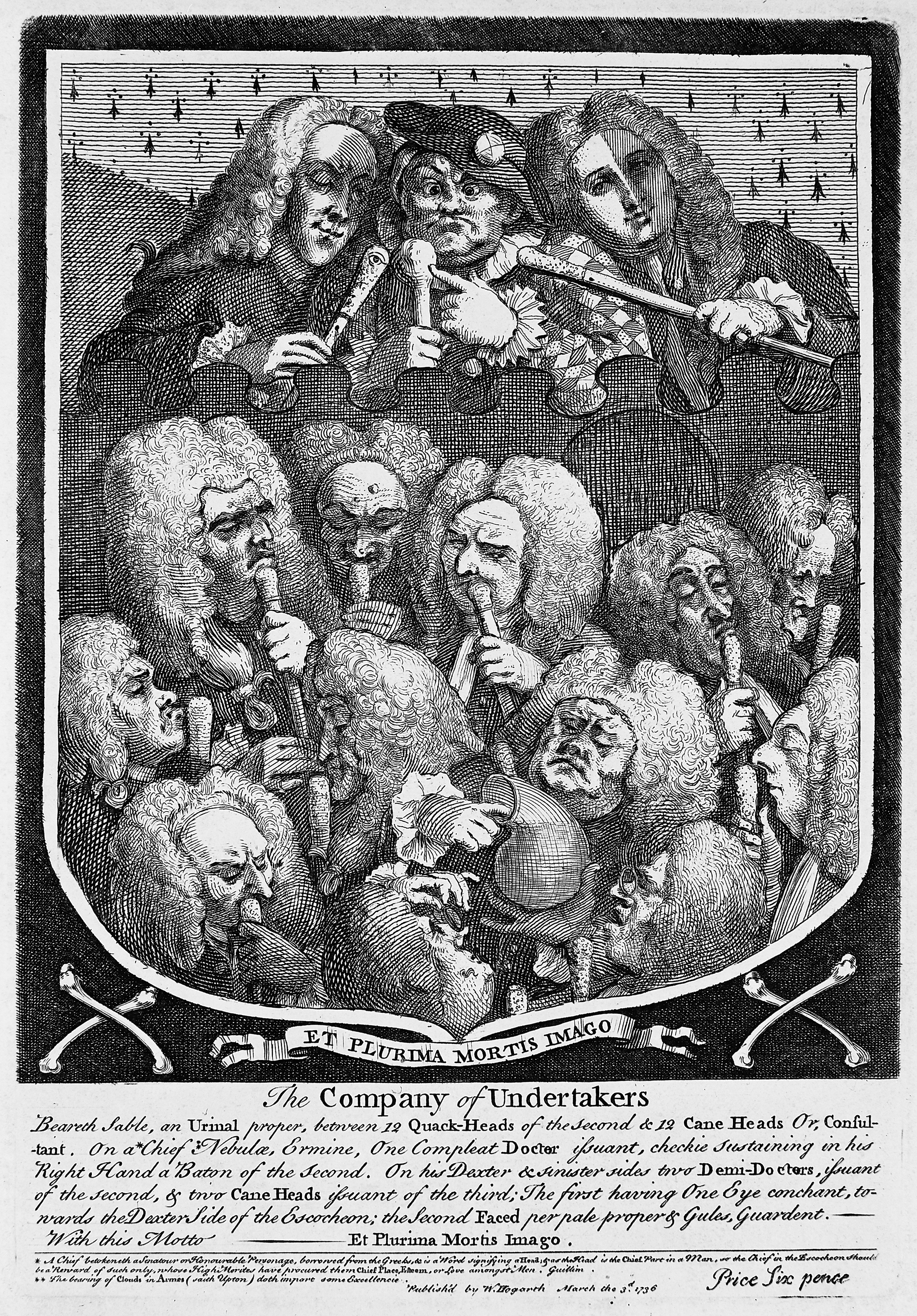
A Consultation of Physicians, or The Company of Undertakers (1736) by William Hogarth satirizes the medical profession and shows a group of doctors, all smelling the pomanders built into the handles of their canes.

Pomanders were first mentioned in literature in the mid-thirteenth century. They were used in the late Middle Ages through the 17th century. In the fashionable society of the 18th century they were mostly replaced by vinaigrette boxes.

=== Medieval ===
Pomanders were first made for carrying as religious keepsakes.

=== Renaissance ===
A recipe for making pomander was included in John Partridge's The Treasury of Commodious Conceits, and Hidden Secrets (London, 1586). Benzoin resin, labdanum and storax balsam were ground into a powder, dissolved in rose water and put into a pan over a fire to cook together. The cooked mixture was then removed from the fire, rolled into an apple shape and coated with a powdered mixture of cinnamon, sweet sanders and cloves. After this, a concoction was made from three grains each of ambergris, deer musk and civet musk. The ambergris was dissolved first and the deer and civet musk mixed in later. The "apple" ball was rolled through the musk concoction to blend in these ingredients and then kneaded to combine and molded back into the shape of an apple.

The scented product was used by royal and aristocratic women in a pomander, a silver or gold ball worn suspended on a chain from a girdle. In 1520, the Duke of Buckingham commissioned a gold pomander with the heraldic badges of Henry VIII and Catherine of Aragon for her New Year's Day gift. Other kinds of jewellery were made as containers for the scent, including tablets or lockets, pendants, bracelets, aglets, buttons and chains with filigree beads.

Mary I of England wore a girdle of "goldsmith's work" with a pomander. Elizabeth I wore pairs of pomander buttons. In 1576, a London goldsmith, John Mabbe, had 224 "pomanders of gold filled with pomander".

Among the jewels of Mary, Queen of Scots, were two complete suites of head-dresses, necklaces and belts comprising openwork or filigree gold perfumed pomander beads to hold scented musk. A string of filigree pomander beads, suitable for a rosary, is thought to have been a gift from Mary, Queen of Scots, to Gillis Mowbray and is held by the National Museum of Scotland.

==== Pouncet box ====
In the late 16th century, the pouncet box appeared which, whilst retaining the traditional features of the pomander, was designed to hold liquid perfumes, blended with powder and absorbed on a sponge or piece of cotton. It was favoured by the upper classes who appreciated the delicacy of the liquid perfumes. Its name stemmed from the fact that the box was "pounced" or pierced to release the scent.

=== Modern ===
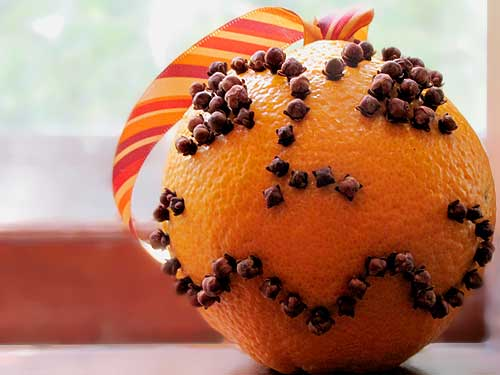
An orange studded with cloves.

One twentieth century style of pomander is made by studding an orange or other fruit with whole dried cloves and letting it cure dry, after which it may last many, many years. This modern pomander serves the functions of perfuming and freshening the air and also of keeping drawers of clothing and linens fresh and pleasant-smelling.

== Ingredients ==
Other ingredients in the process of making pomanders are:

- Agarwood
- Ambergris
- Benzoin resin
- Calamus
- Camphor
- Cinnamon
- Civet (perfumery)
- Cloves
- Gum arabic
- Labdanum
- Lavender
- Mace
- Marjoram
- Musk
- Nutmeg
- Orris root
- Rose oil
- Rosemary
- Scented water
- Spikenard
- Styrax
- Tragacanth
- Vietnamese Balm

== Culture ==
A pomander is worn by Rosemary Woodhouse, in Roman Polanski's 1968 film, Rosemary's Baby. It figures as a central part of the plot development.

The pouncet box is mentioned in Shakespeare's Henry IV Part I when Hotspur is accused of withholding Scottish nobles captured in a skirmish and in self-defence pleads, in describing the King's messenger:

He was perfumèd like a milliner,
And ’twixt his finger and his thumb he held
A pouncet box, which ever and anon
He gave his nose and took't away again,
Who therewith angry, when it next came there,
Took it in snuff; and still he smiled and talked.

== Etymology ==
Medieval pomander paste formulas usually contained ambergris. From this came "pomme ambre" (amber apple) and from there the word pomander was developed. Other names for the pomander are Ambraapfel, Bisamapfel, Bisamknopf, Bisambüchse, balsam apple, Desmerknopf, musk ball Desmerapfel, Oldanokapsel, Pisambüchse, and smelling apple.

== Gallery ==
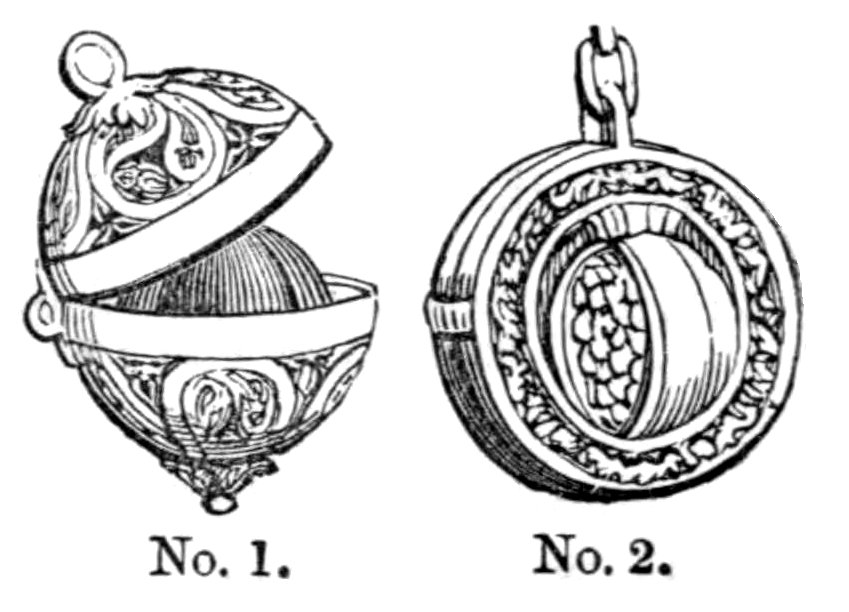
Global and box pomander

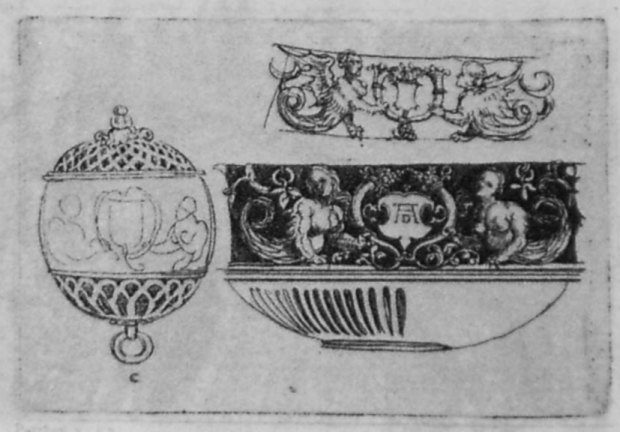
Design for a pomander by Wenzel Hollar

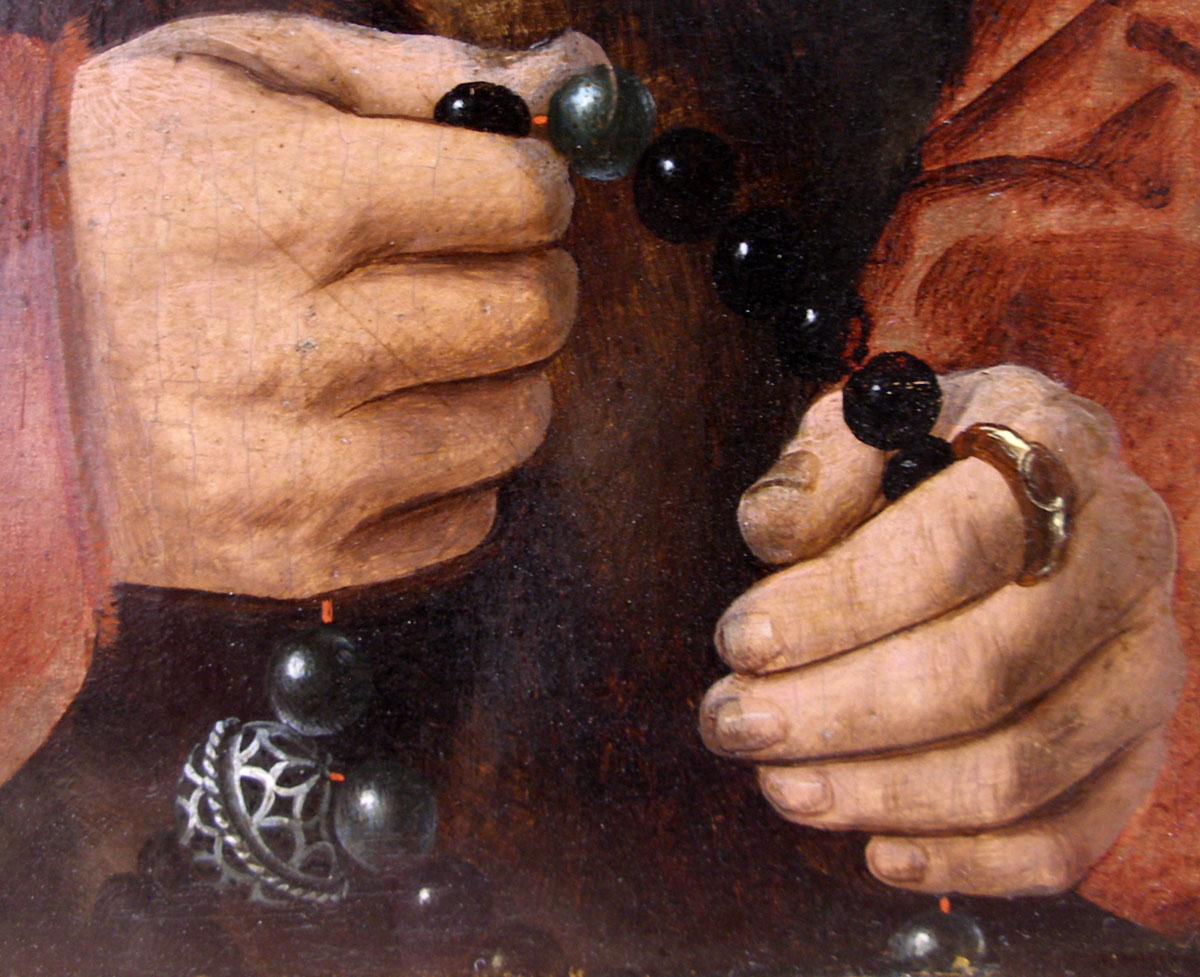
Barthel Bruyn the Elder, Rosary with pomander (Diptych with portraits of the Pilgrum couple (left side: Gerhard Pilgrum) detail)

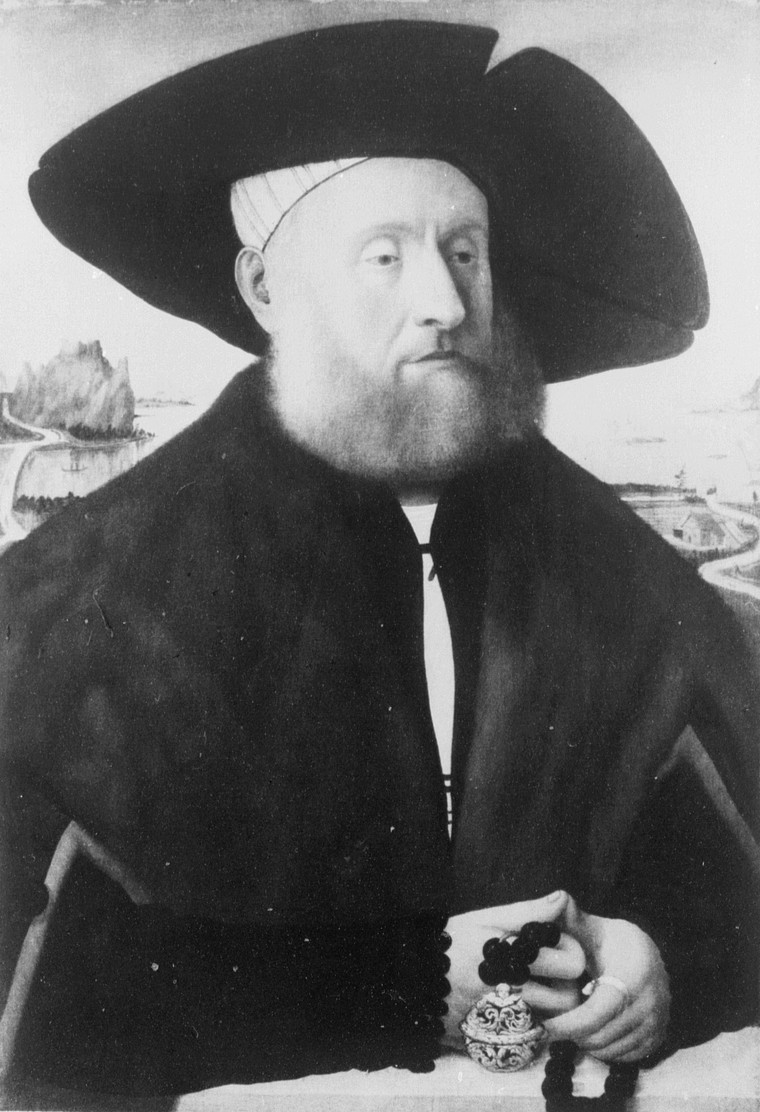
Christoph Amberger, Portrait of a Man (c. 1534–1566)

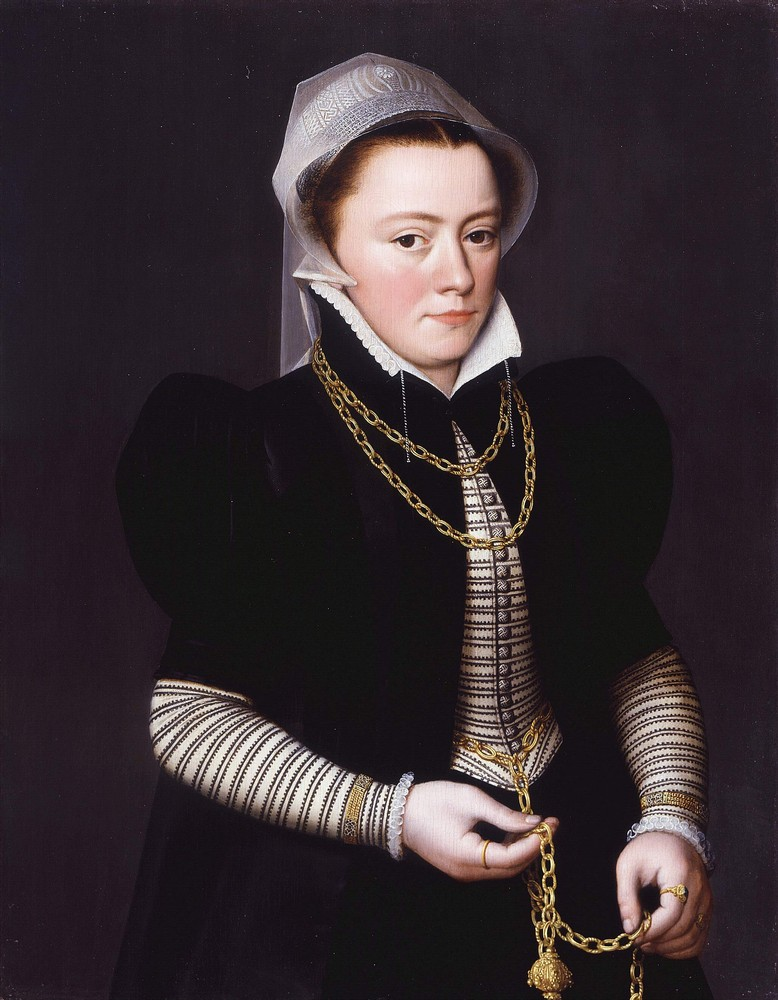
Pourbus, an unknown lady, holding a pomander on a gold chain (c. 1560–1565)

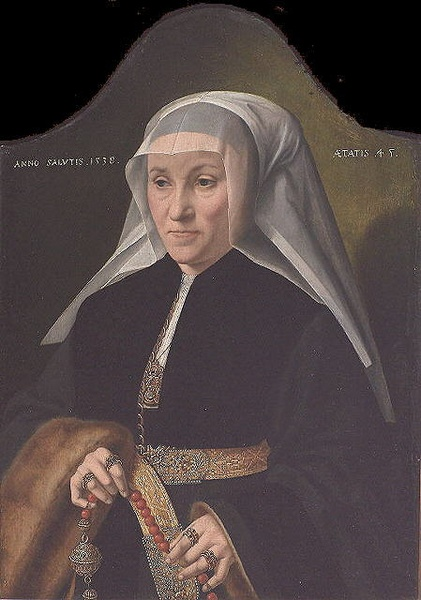
Barthel Bruyn the Elder, portrait of a woman, c. 1538

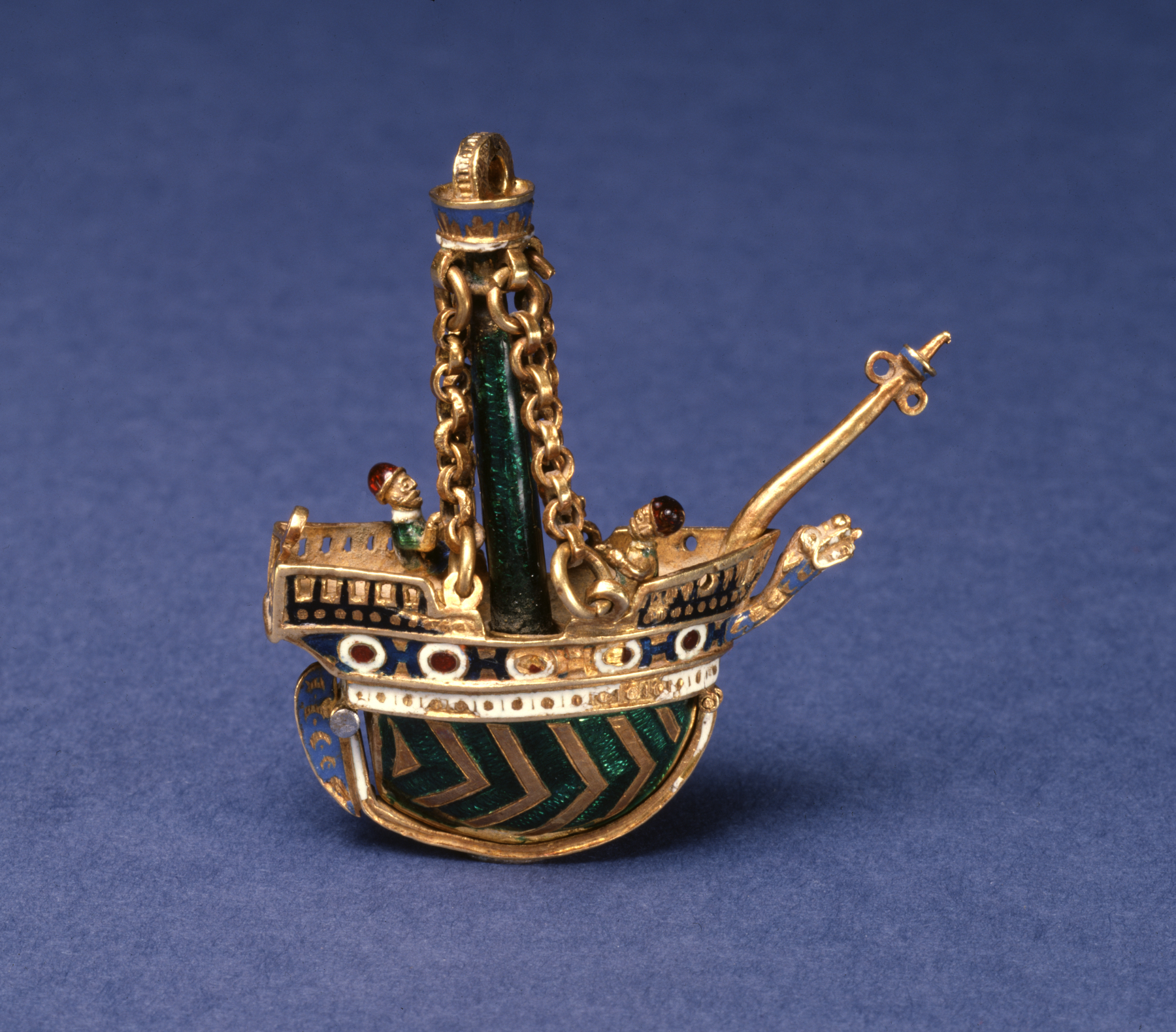
Pomander in the shape of a ship, c. 1600–1650, Walters Art Museum

== See also ==
- Christingle
- Prayer nut
- Sachet (scented bag)

== Sources ==
- Boeser, Knut, The elixirs of Nostradamus: Nostradamus' original recipes for elixirs, scented water, beauty potions, and sweetmeats, Moyer Bell, 1996; ISBN 1-55921-155-5
- Groom, Nigel (1992). "Vinaigrette". The Perfume Handbook. Springer Science & Business Media. p. 248.
- Groom, Nigel, The new perfume handbook, Springer, 1997, ISBN 0-7514-0403-9
- Longman, Rrown, The Archaeological journal, Volume 31, Green and Longman 1874
- Madden, Frederic, Privy purse expenses of the Princess Mary, daughter of King Henry the Eighth, afterwards Queen Mary, W. Pickering 1831
- Schleif, Corine and Volker Schier, Katerina's Windows: Donation and Devotion, Art and Music, as Heard and Seen Through the Writings of a Birgittine Nun, University Park: Penn State Press, 2009, 237, 242–244, ISBN 978-0-271-03369-3
- Turner, W. (January–April 1912). "Pomanders". The Connoisseur: An Illustrated Magazine for Collectors. 32: 151–156.

Attribution
