= Andrew Garcia (disambiguation) =

Andrew Garcia (born 1985) is an American singer.

Andy or Andrew Garcia may also refer to:

- Andrew Garcia (1853–1943), American mountain man in Montana and memoirist (Tough Trip Through Paradise)
- Andy Garcia (born 1956), Cuban-born American actor
- Andrew James Garcia (born 1986), American baseball player a/k/a Drew Garcia
- Andy Garcia (soccer) (born 1995), American midfielder

== See also ==
- Andre Garcia (disambiguation)
- Andrés García (disambiguation)
