= Bronica =

Japanese camera manufacturer

Bronica Co., Ltd.
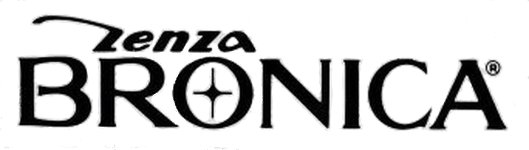
- Native name: ブロニカ株式会社
- Romanized name: Bronica Co., Ltd.
- Formerly: Zenza Bronica Industries, Inc. (ゼンザブロニカ工業株式会社); Shinkodo Works (新光堂製作所)
- Type: Kabushiki Kaisha
- Industry: photography (camera and lens manufacturer)
- Founded: June 30, 1956; 70 years ago in Tokyo, Japan
- Founder: Zenzaburō Yoshino
- Fate: Acquired by Tamron Co., Ltd. (July 1998)
- Successor: Tamron Co., Ltd.
- Headquarters: Tokyo, Japan
- Products: Cameras, optical lenses and other products

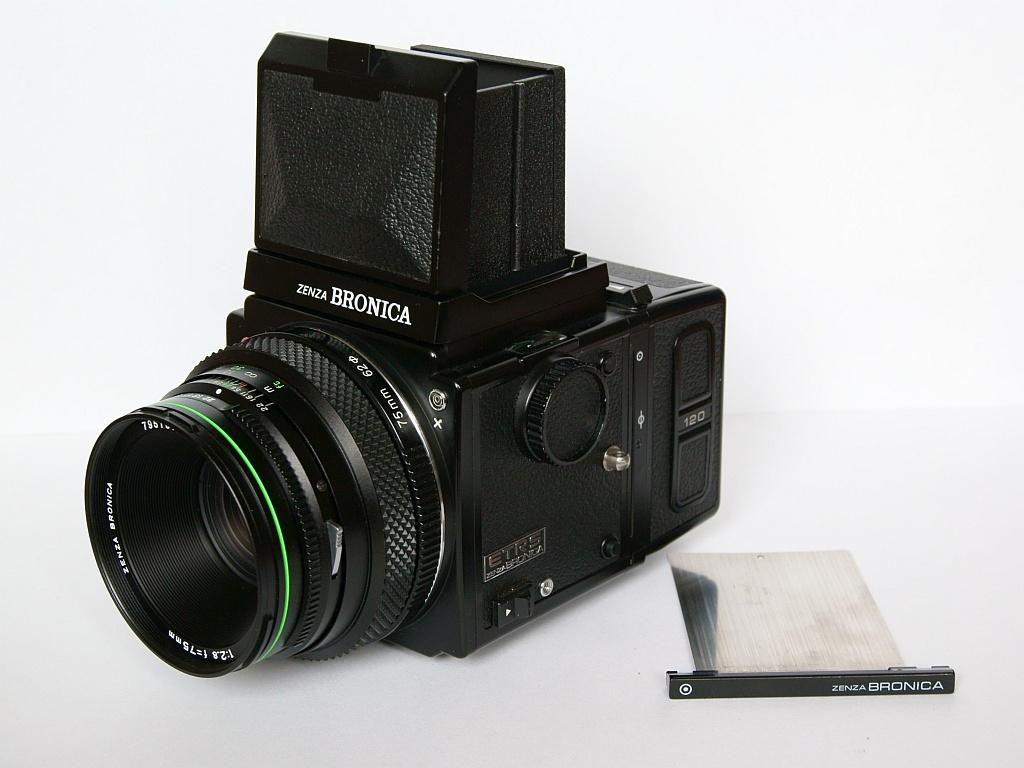
Zenza Bronica ETRS camera, with Bronica Zenzanon EII 75mm f2.8 lens

Bronica also Zenza Bronica (in Japanese: ゼンザブロニカ) was a Japanese manufacturer of classic medium-format roll film cameras and photographic equipment based in Tokyo, Japan. Their single-lens reflex (SLR) system-cameras competed with Pentax, Hasselblad, Mamiya and others in the medium-format camera market.

== History ==
Before introduction of the first of what would become a dynasty of Zenza Bronica cameras in 1959, the Latinized Zenza Bronica name was already a popular Japanese luxury goods brand of the Shinkodo Works (in Japanese: 新光堂製作所) since 1947, specialized in the production of intricate crafted and decorated personal accessories, such as metal cigarette lighters and cases, cosmetic compacts, and watches, of diverse styles and designs.

The company's founder Zenzaburō Yoshino (in Japanese: 吉野善三郎, b. 25 January 1911 — d. 23 November 1988), wherefrom the Latinized Zenza Bronica brand name is derived, was the third son born into a Japanese rice merchant family. At an early age Yoshino showed deep reverence for the technical innovation and mechanics of world-renowned cameras produced by the likes of Leica, Contax and Rollei. Both fascinated and yet increasingly frustrated by the limitations of the cameras produced at that time period, where each camera's merits and demerits were not solved by just one camera, Yoshino visioned creating a high-precision interchangeable single-lens reflex camera modular system of his own design.

Yoshino's ambition, however, would require substantial investment, which he gradually self-funded from his family business in transportation and his passion for cameras by the establishment of a small camera store in Tokyo's Kanda district. Yoshino's camera store and his immense familiarity with deluxe foreign cameras became a huge success with photography enthusiasts in Japan, buying and selling luxury Leica and Contax cameras, which also gained popularity with US Army soldiers stationed in Japan after World War II. This formed the funding basis for his founding in 1947 of the Shinkodo Works with a vision of camera production, which at first produced Bronica brand luxury art deco accessories such as cigarette lighters and cases including watches, and positioned Bronica as a luxury brand in Japanese department stores, with popularity thriving among US Army soldiers in Japan.

The Shinkodo Works was Yoshino's precursor production base and funding source for what would later serve his Bronica camera and photographic equipment manufacturing; later consolidated under the Zenza Bronica Kogyo Kabushiki Kaisha (Zenza Bronica Industries, Inc) company. On 17 January 1952, the Shinkodo Works was directed by Yoshino to begin research and development of the Bronica prototype camera.

=== Film camera production ===
The prototype was a modular camera named the "Yoshino Flex". In June 1956 the Shinkodo Works created its first handmade example camera, and on reaching perfection in October 1958 with Yoshino's eighth prototype camera, the development costs had reached a sum of 200 million Yen, a huge sum at that time. The final prototype bore the Latinized nameplate "ZENZA BRONICA"—the Bronica Z (Zen-za) rollfilm camera—and first appeared at the Philadelphia Camera Show in March 1959, where it received ecstatic industry press coverage and left a deep lasting impression of being the world's dream camera. The Bronica Z modular camera system, shortly later with slight modifications renamed the Zenza Bronica D (Deluxe) and successor Bronicas, using large-coverage film format, high-quality Nikkor lenses supplied by the then Japan Optical Industries Co., Ltd., (Nikon Corporation) became instant successes in the deluxe camera market worldwide. The Bronica D was the Japanese answer and first serious challenger to the Swedish Hasselblad cameras, and in several technical ways outclassed the Swedish offerings. Such was the design success of Bronica, that in the United States it attracted influential figures from the photographic industry such as Burt Keppler who met with Yoshino. Bronica later introduced optics and lens units of its own manufacture incorporating Seiko shutters with its later camera designs and held a portfolio of international patents.

=== Acquisition and product discontinuation ===
Bronica was eventually acquired by the lens manufacturer Tamron Co., Ltd., in 1998 with emphasis on Bronica's optical lens manufacturing. In May 2000, Tamron introduced under the Bronica brand the RF645 rangefinder camera. Tamron discontinued the brand's single-lens reflex camera models (ETRSi, SQ-Ai, SQ-B and GS-1) between June 2002 and December 2004, sales having suffered from the lack of consideration to a digital camera back and loss of market share to digital photography and digital single-lens reflex (DSLR) cameras, particularly for the wedding and portrait photography business which had previously been a heavy user of medium-format photographic film but switched quickly to digital photography for its commercial workflow benefits. Bronica's last model, the RF645 rangefinder camera, was discontinued in September 2005, and marked the termination of the Bronica camera brand business.

Bronicas were workhorse photographic film cameras used by professional photographers for many years until the process of digital photography became widely adopted. Bronica cameras are, however, still widely used by photographers—both professional and advanced amateurs—whilst the commercial production of photographic 120 film remains available, in no small part due to superior image quality of 6x4.5, 6x6 and 6x7cm photographic film formats over smaller film (35mm) and digital image sensor formats.

=== JCII camera museum ===
The Japan Camera and Optical Instruments Inspection and Testing Institute (JCII) at its camera museum located in Ichibanchō district, central Tokyo, has a selection of Bronica camera models preserved among its museum display collections; as part of the museum's designation "preserving cameras considered of historical significance".

== Bronica models ==
Bronica SLR system-cameras employed a modular design: The major components of the camera—lens, body, film-back and viewfinder were separate and interchangeable, providing options to match the specific photography or workflow needs of the photographer.

=== Classic models ===
From its start, Bronica introduced a number of 6×6 cm medium-format SLR cameras with focal plane shutter, which used Nikkor lenses from Nikon, until this line was discontinued with the introduction of the successor Bronica SQ-series.

Bronica classic models (6×6 format, focal plane shutter)
Camera Spec.		Z / D	S	C	C2	S2 / S2A	EC	EC-TL / EC-TL II
Dates	Intro.	Mar 1959	Apr 1961	Dec 1964	May 1965	Jul 1965	Apr 1972	Jun 1975
Dates	Disc.	Mar 1961	Apr 1965	May 1965	Sep 1972	Sep 1977	Dec 1978	Mar 1980
Image		55.2×55.2 mm (2.17×2.17 in)						
Shutter	Control	Mechanical					Electronic	
Shutter	Speeds	B+1-1/1250	B+1-1/1000	B+1-1/500		B+1-1/1000	B+4-1/1000	
Shutter	X-sync	1/50		1/40			1/60	
Dims.	W×L×D (Note: Body with back and waist-level finder; excludes lens.)	89×136×86 mm (3.5×5.4×3.4 in)	100×140×100 mm (3.9×5.5×3.9 in)				139×170×117 mm (5.5×6.7×4.6 in)	
Dims.	Wgt.	1,165 g (41.1 oz)	?	1,780 g (63 oz)			1,960 g (69 oz)	2,050 g (72 oz)
Notes		(Z)en-za. Debuted at Philadelphia Camera Show; renamed (D)eluxe in Dec 1959 with slight modifications.	(S)tandard	(C)ompact, fixed back		S2A introduced 1969, S2A type 2 introduced 1972	(E)lectrical (C)ontrol	(E)lectrical (C)ontrol with (T)hrough-the-(L)ens aperture priority autoexposure; EC-TL II introduced Oct 1978.

In addition to the standard waist-level finder, the S2A was compatible with two eye-level prism viewfinders ("Model A" and "Model C"; the eyepiece of the "C" is tilted slightly upwards), a magnifying finder, an open-frame sports finder, and a top-down finder with through-the-lens metering. As an alternative, a prism finder ("Model B") could be inserted into the waist-level finder. Grip options included a pistol grip, which threaded onto the bottom of the camera, a hand grip ("Model L") for the left hand, and a two-handed rifle grip for telephoto lenses. Two film backs were available, in 6×6 and 6×4.5 formats; the insert for these backs could be switched between 120 and 220 film.

Notably, the Bronica EC was the first medium-format SLR camera with an electrically operated focal plane shutter (Japan Patent No.: 43/94431 24 December 1968; US Patent No. US3696727), while the EC-TL was the first medium-format camera with Aperture priority automatic exposure (AE).

The range of Nikkor lenses for these cameras reached from 30mm (fisheye) to 1200mm and comprised about 30 lenses. Lens optics supplied by Carl Zeiss in Jena, Tokyo Optical Co., Ltd., Norita optics, Komura-Komuranon (Sankyo Kohki), Schneider Kreuznach, as well as lens optics later manufactured by Bronica itself (Zenzanon) based on designs by Zeiss and Japanese lens manufacturers were available, as well as a wide range of accessories, including different film magazines, bellows, and viewfinders.

Lenses for Bronica classic models
Name	FL	Ap.	Const.	Angle	Min. focus	Filt.	Mount (Note: Refers to lens mounting: Small = Lens uses small, internal bayonet and in-body helicoid focus; Large = Lens uses large, external bayonet and helicoid focus in lens; requires removal of focusing mount)	Wgt.	Notes
Ultra wide-angle lenses
Nikkor-D	40	f/4.0–22	10e/8g	89°	0.28 m (11 in)	90	S	430 g (15 oz)	
Zenzanon MC	40	f/4.0–22	9e/7g	89°	0.27 m (11 in)	67	S	330 g (12 oz)	Manufactured by Norita Optical
Wide angle lenses
Nikkor-O	50	f/2.8–22	8e/7g	76°	0.30 m (12 in)	77	S	450 g (16 oz)	
Zenzanon MC	50	f/2.8–22	8e/7g	76°	0.33 m (1 ft 1 in)	67	S	320 g (11 oz)	Manufactured by Norita Optical
Nikkor-H	50	f/3.5–22	6e/6g	76°	0.30 m (12 in)	82	S	460 g (16 oz)	
Normal lenses
Nikkor-P	75	f/2.8–22	5e/4g	55°	0.58 m (23 in)	67	S	230 g (8.1 oz)	Small (internal) bayonet; also takes Ser. VIII filters. Xenotar-derived (Tronnier).
Nikkor-H	75	f/2.8–22	6e/4g	55°	0.60 m (2 ft 0 in)	67	S	290 g (10 oz)	
Zenzanon	75	f/2.8–22	5e/4g	55°	0.60 m (2 ft 0 in)	67	S	210 g (7.4 oz)	Possibly manufactured by Tokyo Optical (Topcon)
Zenzanon MC	80	f/2.4–22	6e/5g	52°	0.70 m (2 ft 4 in)	67	S	300 g (11 oz)	Probably manufactured by Norita Optical
Zenzanon MC	80	f/2.8–22	5e/4g	52°	0.70 m (2 ft 4 in)	67	S	?	Marked 'by Carl Zeiss Jena DDR'
Zenzanon	100	f/2.8–22	6e/4g	43°	0.91 m (3 ft)	67	S	360 g (13 oz)	possibly manufactured by Tokyo Optical (Topcon)
Nikkor-Q.LS	105	f/3.5–32	4e/3g	41°	1.32 m (4 ft 4 in)	67	L	700 g (25 oz)	In-lens leaf shutter; Tessar construction
Portrait lenses
Nikkor-Q	135	f/3.5–32	4e/3g	32°	1.2 m (4 ft)	67	S	410 g (14 oz)	Long focus; also takes Ser. VIII filters; Tessar construction
Zenzanon	150	f/3.5–22	5e/4g	29°	1.98 m (6 ft 6 in)	67	S	550 g (19 oz)	
Zenzanon MC	150	f/3.5–22	6e/6g	29°	?	67	S	?	
Nikkor-H	180	f/2.5–32	6e/4g	24°	1.5 m (5 ft)	S.IX	?	?	Short-mount, requires adapter tube
Zenzanon MC	200	f/3.5–22	5e/5g	22°	3.3 m (11 ft)	67	S	640 g (23 oz)	
Nikkor-P	200	f/4.0–22	5e/5g	22°	2.82 m (9 ft 3 in)	67	S	750 g (26 oz)	
Telephoto lenses
Nikkor-Q	250	f/4.0–32	4e/3g	18°	2.4 m (8 ft)	S.IX	?	?	Short-mount, requires adapter tube
Zenzanon	300	f/4.5–32	6e/5g	15°	4.04 m (13 ft 3 in)	82	L	1,800 g (63 oz)	
Nikkor-P	300	f/5.6–32	5e/5g	15°	?	67	?	?	
Nikkor-T	350	f/4.5–22	3e	13°	4.0 m (13 ft)	S.IX	?	?	Short-mount, requires adapter tube
Nikkor-Q	400	f/4.5–22	4e/4g	11°	4.9 m (16 ft)	122	L	3,300 g (120 oz)	Focusing mount
Nikkor-T	500	f/5.0–45	3e	9°	6.1 m (20 ft)	110	?	?	Short-mount, requires adapter tube
Nikkor-P	600	f/5.6–22	5e/4g	7°	11 m (36 ft)	122	L	3,800 g (130 oz)	Focusing mount
Nikkor-P	800	f/8.0–22	5e/5g	6°	19 m (62 ft)	122	L	4,200 g (150 oz)	Focusing mount
Nikkor-P	1200	f/11–64	5e/4g	4°	43 m (141 ft)	122	L	5,000 g (180 oz)	Focusing mount

=== ETR series ===
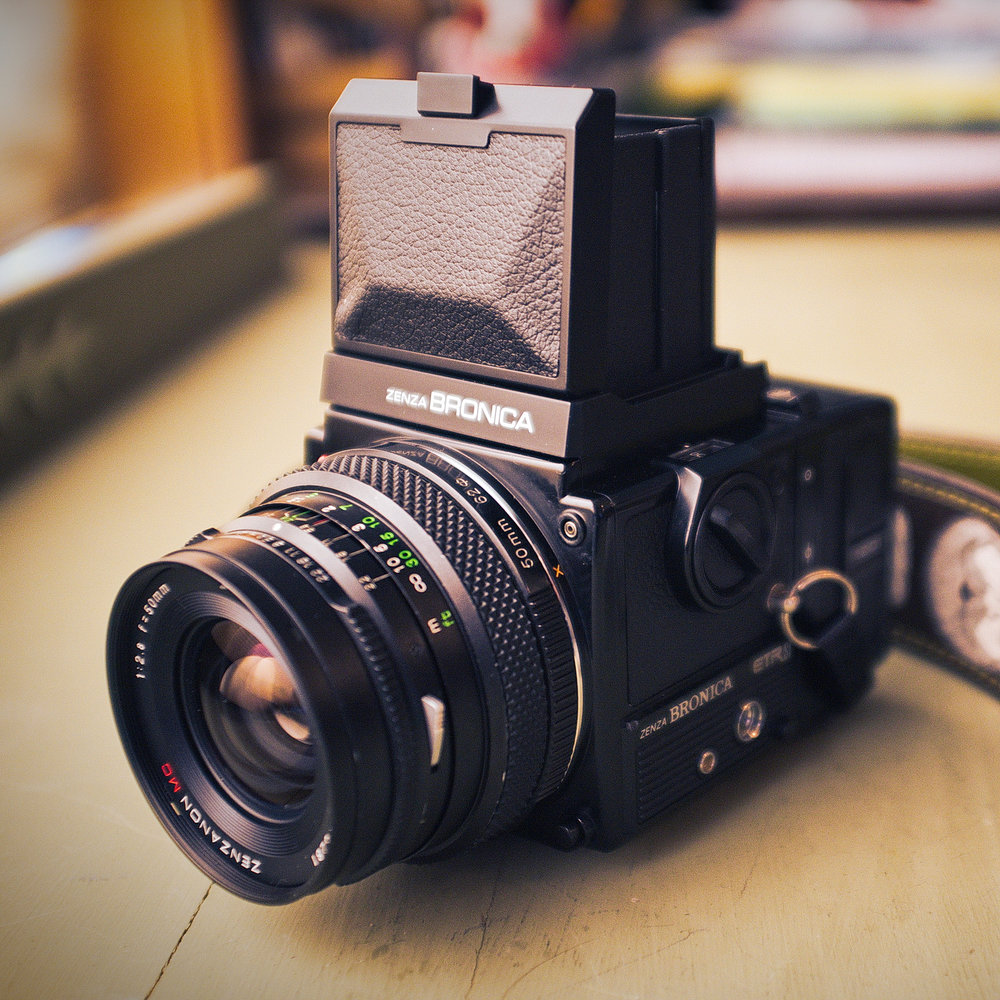
Bronica ETRSi with 50 mm lens and waist-level finder

The ETR series is a line of advanced, compact, modular electronic 6×4.5 cm medium-format SLR camera system with a vast array of finders, film-backs, and other accessories. ETR is an acronym for (E)lectronic, (TTL)-metering, (R)eflex. In 1977 the ETR received Japan's Good Design Award.

The ETR series can be broken into three distinct generations:

1. ETR & ETR-C: The ETR-C is identical to the ETR model except film magazine cannot be removed from film-back.
2. ETRS & ETRC: The ETRS is an improved version of the ETR with an extra contact to support auto-exposure mode with the metered prism finder AE-II and later AE-III. The ETRS was modified in July 1982: Lens release sliding lever latch located to left side of camera side panel, film-backs released using two independent tabs. This version is reputedly referred to as the "plastic" body ETRS and film-back, for the change in the side panels of the body and film-backs to polycarbonate. Like the ETR-C, the ETRC is identical to the ETRS model except film magazine cannot be removed from film-back.
3. ETRSi: an improved version of the ETRS with mirror lock-up capability. Capable of through-the-lens off-the-filmplane (TTL-OTF) flash exposure. Significantly improved film-back design (Si) with locking darkslide.

Bronica ETR series (645 format, leaf shutter)
Camera Spec.		ETR	ETR-C	ETRS	ETRC	ETRSi
Camera Spec.				Zenza Bronica ETRS with Zenzanon EII 75mm f2.8 lens		ETRSi 40th anniversary edition in champagne metallic colour, with manual shutter-release handgrip and metered prism viewfinder attached, released 9 May 1999
Dates	Intro.	Mar 1976	Nov 1977	Oct 1978		Dec 1988
Dates	Disc.	Mar 1980	Dec 1980	Sep 1989	Oct 1980	Dec 2004
Image (W×H)		55.1×42.5 mm (2.17×1.67 in)				
Shutter	Control	Electronic, leaf				
Shutter	Speeds	T+8-1/500				
Shutter	X-sync	1/500				
Dims.	W×L×H (Note: With normal lens, film back, and waist-level finder; normal lenses are 75 mm (ETR/645), 80 mm (SQ/6×6), or 100 mm (GS/6×7).)	110×160×106 mm (4.3×6.3×4.2 in)		91×165×107 mm (3.6×6.5×4.2 in) 91×69×87 mm (3.6×2.7×3.4 in) (Note: Camera body only, excluding lens, back, and finder)	110×160×87 mm (4.3×6.3×3.4 in)	92×163×107 mm (3.6×6.4×4.2 in) 92×69×87 mm (3.6×2.7×3.4 in)
Dims.	Wgt.	1,346 g (47.5 oz)		1,280 g (45 oz) 465 g (16.4 oz)	1,220 g (43 oz)	1,285 g (45.3 oz) 480 g (17 oz)
Notes			fixed-back version of ETR		fixed-back version of ETRS	

Seventeen lenses with leaf shutters were made for the ETR-system from a fisheye, to four different zooms, to a 500mm super telephoto, to a unique 55mm tilt shift lens.

Lenses for Bronica ETR series
Name	FL	Ap.	Const.	Angle	Min. focus	Filt.	Φ×L	Wgt.	Notes
Fisheye lenses
Zenzanon-PE	30	f/3.5–22	11e/8g	180°	0.27 m (11 in)	32.5 (rear)	95×84.5 mm (3.74×3.33 in)	900 g (32 oz)	
Wide angle lenses
Zenzanon MC (Note: Some lenses marked Zenzanon-E)	40	f/4.0–22	9e/7g	82°	0.4 m (1 ft 4 in)	72	?×62 mm (2.4 in)	478 g (16.9 oz)	
Zenzanon-E	40	f/4.0–22	10e/8g	82°	0.4 m (1 ft 4 in)	62	?×53 mm (2.1 in)	515 g (18.2 oz)	
Zenzanon-PE	40	f/4.0–22	9e/8g	82°	0.35 m (1 ft 2 in)	62	82×50.5 mm (3.23×1.99 in)	510 g (18 oz)	
Zenzanon-PE Asph.	45~90	f/4.0~5.6–32	11e/10g	42~75°	1.0 m (3 ft 3 in)	95	102.5×108.5 mm (4.04×4.27 in)	1,015 g (35.8 oz)	
Zenzanon MC	50	f/2.8–22	8e/7g	70°	0.5 m (1 ft 8 in)	62	?×62.5 mm (2.46 in)	464 g (16.4 oz)	
Zenzanon-E	50	f/2.8–22	9e/8g	70°	0.5 m (1 ft 8 in)	62	?×51 mm (2.0 in)	480 g (17 oz)	
Zenzanon-PE	50	f/2.8–22	9e/7g	70°	0.46 m (1 ft 6 in)	62	82×50.5 mm (3.23×1.99 in)	490 g (17 oz)	
Zenzanon-E Super-Angulon PCS	55	f/4.5–32	10e/8g	65°	0.5 m (1 ft 8 in)	104 (bayonet)	104×157 mm (4.1×6.2 in)	1,650 g (58 oz)	
Zenzanon-PE Super-Angulon PCS	55	f/4.5–32	10e/8g	65°	0.5 m (1 ft 8 in)	104 (bayonet)	104×149 mm (4.1×5.9 in)	1,650 g (58 oz)	
Zenzanon-PE	60	f/2.8–22	7e/7g	60°	0.42 m (1 ft 5 in)	62	82×54 mm (3.2×2.1 in)	520 g (18 oz)	
Normal lenses
Zenzanon-E Variogon	70~140	f/4.5–32	15e/13g	28~53°	1.8 m (5 ft 11 in)	Ser.9a	100×159 mm (3.9×6.3 in)	1,500 g (53 oz)	
Zenzanon-PE Variogon	70~140	f/4.5–32	15e/13g	28~53°	0.25 m (9.8 in)	Ser.9a	100×152.5 mm (3.94×6.00 in)	1,500 g (53 oz)	
Zenzanon MC	75	f/2.8–22	5e/4g	50°	0.4 m (1 ft 4 in)	58	?×54.3 mm (2.14 in)	417 g (14.7 oz)	
Zenzanon-E II	75	f/2.8–22	6e/4g	50°	0.6 m (2 ft 0 in)	62	?×51 mm (2.0 in)	450 g (16 oz)	
Zenzanon-PE	75	f/2.8–22	6e/5g	50°	0.6 m (2 ft 0 in)	62	82×49.5 mm (3.23×1.95 in)	440 g (16 oz)	
Macro Zenzanon-E	100	f/4.0–32	6e/4g	38°	0.61 m (2 ft 0 in)	62	82×87 mm (3.2×3.4 in)	650 g (23 oz)	
Macro Zenzanon-PE	100	f/4.0–32	6e/5g	38°	0.61 m (2 ft 0 in)	62	82×86.7 mm (3.23×3.41 in)	650 g (23 oz)	
Zenzanon-PE Asph. (IF)	100~220	f/4.8–32	16e/13g	18~38°	1.0 m (3 ft 3 in)	95	106.5×180.5 mm (4.19×7.11 in)	2,175 g (76.7 oz)	
Zenzanon-E	105	f/3.5–22	6e/4g	37°	0.9 m (2 ft 11 in)	62	?×66 mm (2.6 in)	570 g (20 oz)	
Macro Zenzanon-PE	105	f/4.5–32	9e/8g	37°	0.35 m (1 ft 2 in)	67	86×104 mm (3.4×4.1 in)	920 g (32 oz)	
Portrait lenses
Zenzanon-E Variogon	125~250	f/5.6–32	17e/14g	16~31°	2.5 m (8 ft 2 in)	Ser.9a	105×213 mm (4.1×8.4 in)	1,650 g (58 oz)	
Zenzanon-PE Variogon	125~250	f/5.6–32	17e/14g	16~31°	0.76 m (2 ft 6 in)	Ser.9a	94×206 mm (3.7×8.1 in)	1,650 g (58 oz)	
Zenzanon-PE	135	f/4.0–32	6e/4g	29°	1.0 m (3 ft 3 in)	62	82×91.5 mm (3.23×3.60 in)	750 g (26 oz)	
Zenzanon-E	150	f/3.5–22	5e/5g	26°	1.5 m (4 ft 11 in)	62	?×73 mm (2.9 in)	625 g (22.0 oz)	
Zenzanon-PE	150	f/3.5–22	6e/5g	26°	1.5 m (4 ft 11 in)	62	82×71 mm (3.2×2.8 in)	635 g (22.4 oz)	
Zenzanon MC	150	f/4.0–22	6e/6g	26°	1.5 m (4 ft 11 in)	62	?×86 mm (3.4 in)	605 g (21.3 oz)	
Zenzanon-PE	180	f/4.5–32	9e/8g	22°	1.0 m (3 ft 3 in)	62	82×107.5 mm (3.23×4.23 in)	840 g (30 oz)	
Zenzanon-E	200	f/4.5–32	5e/5g	20°	2.0 m (6 ft 7 in)	62	?×103 mm (4.1 in)	700 g (25 oz)	
Zenzanon-PE	200	f/4.5–32	6e/5g	20°	2.0 m (6 ft 7 in)	62	82×109 mm (3.2×4.3 in)	775 g (27.3 oz)	
Telephoto lenses
Zenzanon MC	250	f/5.6–32	6e/6g	16°	3.5 m (11 ft)	62	?×148 mm (5.8 in)	820 g (29 oz)	
Zenzanon-E	250	f/5.6–32	5e/5g	16°	3.0 m (9.8 ft)	62	?×141 mm (5.6 in)	840 g (30 oz)	
Zenzanon-PE	250	f/5.6–45	6e/6g	16°	3.0 m (9.8 ft)	62	82×147 mm (3.2×5.8 in)	910 g (32 oz)	
Zenzanon-E II	500	f/8–45	7e/6g	8°	8.5 m (28 ft)	95	102×267 mm (4.0×10.5 in)	1,890 g (67 oz)	
Zenzanon-PE	500	f/8–64	11e/10g	8°	8.0 m (26.2 ft)	122	139×318 mm (5.5×12.5 in)	3,760 g (133 oz)	
Teleconverters
Tele-Converter PE 2×	2×	+2	7e/6g	approx. 1/2	no change	—N/a	83×53 mm (3.3×2.1 in)	460 g (16 oz)	
Tele-Converter PE 1.4×	1.4×	+1	5e/5g	approx. 1/1.4	no change	—N/a	83×28 mm (3.3×1.1 in)	300 g (11 oz)	

=== SQ series ===
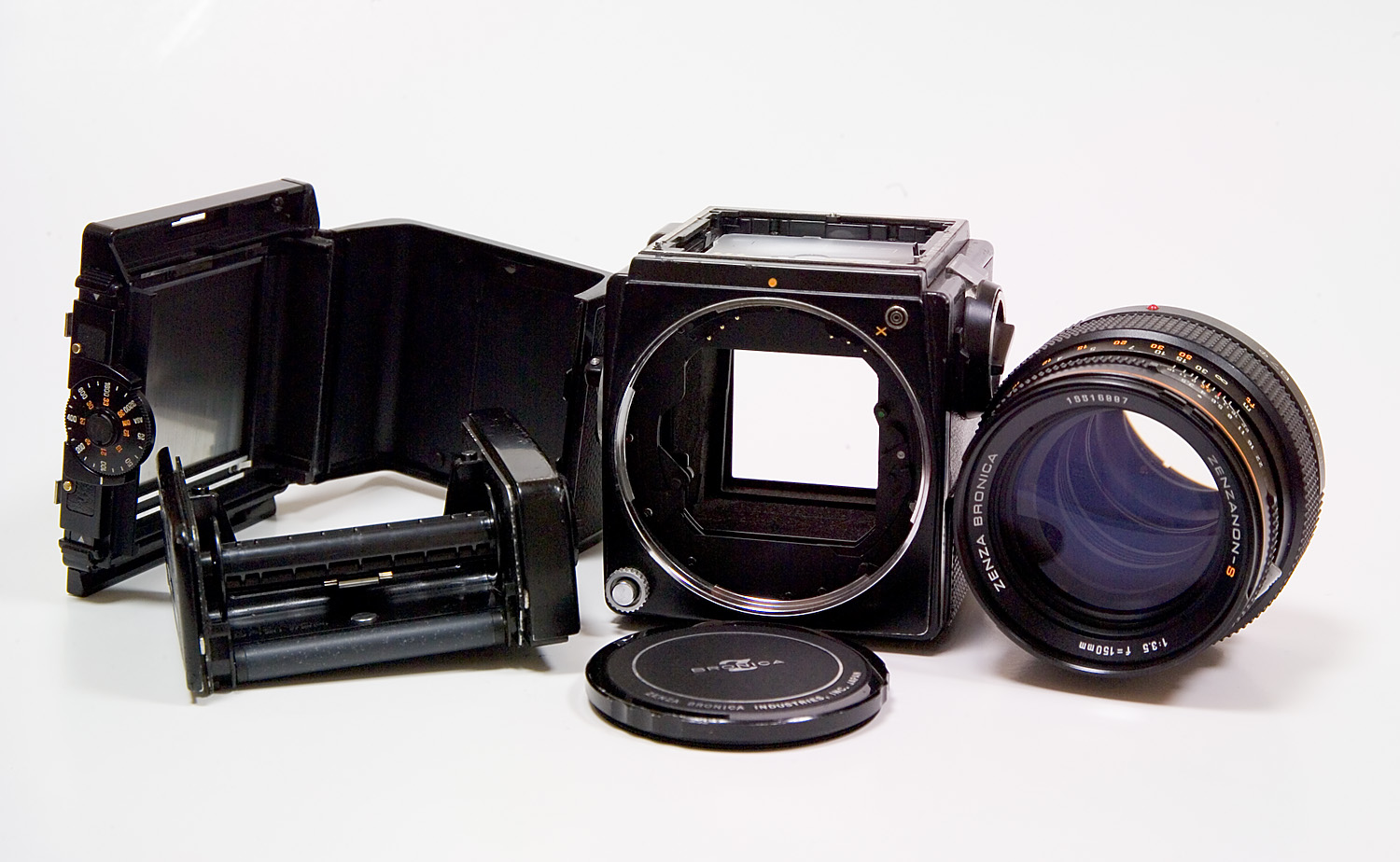
Bronica SQ, disassembled into its primary modules: film back (left), body (center), and lens (right)

The Bronica SQ series was introduced in August 1980 as a replacement and successor to Bronica's classic and increasingly bulky Nikkor-lens based 6×6 cameras. Like the classic line, the SQ series was a modular 6x6 cm traditional "square" aspect ratio, medium-format SLR camera system; similar to the ETR series, the SQ series use in-lens leaf shutters instead of the in-body focal plane shutters of the classic line.

There are three distinct generations in the SQ series:

1. SQ (1980)
2. SQ-A / SQ-Am (1982)
3. SQ-Ai (1990) / SQ-B (1996)

Bronica SQ series (6×6 format, leaf shutter)
Camera Spec.		SQ	SQ-A	SQ-Am	SQ-Ai	SQ-B
Camera Spec.		The Bronica SQ camera takes photographs on 120 and 220 roll-film, 135 cartridge-loaded film and Polaroid Land pack film, using exclusive film-backs for each film type.	Bronica SQ-A with 80mm lens, grip/winder, and AE finder		Zenza Bronica SQ-Ai with Zenzanon-PS f4 40mm lens	
Dates	Intro.	Aug 1980	Jan 1982	Aug 1982	Aug 1990	Apr 1996
Dates	Disc.	Sep 1984	Dec 1991	Mar 1991	Dec 2003	
Image (W×H)		55.6×55.6 mm (2.19×2.19 in)				
Shutter	Control	Electronic, leaf				
Shutter	Speeds	T+8-1/500				
Shutter	X-sync	1/500				
Dims.	W×L×H	92×179×102 mm (3.6×7.0×4.0 in)	92×179×109 mm (3.6×7.0×4.3 in)	144.5×179×109 mm (5.69×7.05×4.29 in) 144.5×132×93 mm (5.69×5.20×3.66 in)	92×179×109 mm (3.6×7.0×4.3 in)	
Dims.	Wgt.	1,500 g (53 oz)		1,925 g (67.9 oz) 960 g (34 oz)	1,515 g (53.4 oz)	1,460 g (51 oz)
Notes						(B)asic model

As original equipment, the SQ was equipped with the Waist-Level Finder S, which provided a reversed view (right-to-left) as the camera is held at waist level, looking down at the open finder shaded by the pop-up hood, offering operation similar to the classic Bronica and Hasselblad V series. To enable operation similar to a 35 mm SLR, the SQ could be equipped with the Prism Finder S and Speed Grip S, which provided unreversed, eye-level viewing through a pentaprism finder, and thumb-operated film advance, coupled mechanically to the regular winding crank. The Prism Finder 45D S is an unmetered prism finder which allows a hybrid of eye- and waist-level viewing. In addition, two metered finders were offered: the MF Finder S, a metered top-down magnifying finder, and the ME Prism Finder S, an eye-level finder alternative to the unmetered Prism Finder S; both of these featured CdS photoresistors.

The first-generation SQ was succeeded by the second-generation SQ-A and SQ-Am in 1982; these featured ten contact pins for the viewfinder, and with the AE Prism Finder S, allowed aperture-priority autoexposure. In addition, a mirror lock-up lever was added. The film-backs were modified slightly, with the ISO dial for the original film-backs having white and orange numerals, and the new with silver. The darkslide was changed to the locking style; to lock required both the new grey handle slide and the new silver numeral ISO dial back. All accessories for SQ cameras fit the SQ-A, however the AE finder cannot physically mount on the SQ; a safety defeat pin prevents attachment. All of the accessories offered with the SQ are compatible with the SQ-A. The SQ-Am has an integrated grip and motor-driven film advance, which takes an additional six AA batteries.

The third generation was introduced with the SQ-Ai in 1990, a decade after the initial SQ was released. An improved AE Prism Finder SQ-i was released alongside the SQ-Ai, which was backwards compatible with the SQ-A and SQ-Am. Compared to the SQ-A/Am, the SQ-Ai replaced both by separating the motor drive as an add-on unit (SQ-i); in addition, the SQ-Ai added off the film (TTL-OTF) metering with select flash guns. These changes required the addition of a circuit board which also required the battery compartment to be "flattened." The single 6v cell was replaced with four 1.5 volt "button" cells. A bulb 'B' setting was added to the shutter speed selector. The film-back was also modified again with the introduction of the SQ-Ai, relocating the ISO dial to the rear of the film-back (rather than on top) to allow the speed setting to be seen better with a prism attached. Exposure compensation control was also added to the new SQ-Ai film-back, with the ISO range extended to 6400. The SQ-B also belongs to the third generation; this (B)asic model was a manually operating SLR evolved from the SQ-Ai, built to primarily satisfy the needs of professional "studio" photographers who work with hand-held light meters, studio or portable flash equipment and various other accessories. Thus, motorized film-advance and through-the-lens metering (TTL) functionality were not present, as well as B (bulb exposure), as found on other SQ-series models. T (time exposure), however, was available when utilizing the appropriate SQ-series Zenzanon-S/PS lenses which incorporated the time (T) exposure lever function; by default the Zenzanon-PS/B 80mm f/2.8 lens which accompanied the SQ-B model did not include this feature. All SQ-series accessories and lenses were interchangeable with the SQ-B with few exceptions.

Lenses for Bronica SQ series
Name	FL	Ap.	Const.	Angle	Min. focus	Filt.	Φ×L	Wgt.	Notes
Fisheye and Ultra wide angle lenses
Zenzanon-PS	35	f/3.5–22	11e/8g	180°	0.28 m (11 in)	32.5 (rear)	98×91 mm (3.9×3.6 in)	960 g (34 oz)	
Zenzanon-S	40	f/4.0–22	11e/8g	89°	0.4 m (1 ft 4 in)	95	102×83 mm (4.0×3.3 in)	660 g (23 oz)	
Zenzanon-PS	40	f/4.0–22	11e/8g	89°	0.4 m (1 ft 4 in)	95	98×67.5 mm (3.86×2.66 in)	650 g (23 oz)	
Wide angle lenses
Zenzanon-S	50	f/3.5–22	10e/8g	76°	0.5 m (1 ft 8 in)	67	82×62 mm (3.2×2.4 in)	560 g (20 oz)	
Zenzanon-PS	50	f/3.5–22	10e/8g	76°	0.5 m (1 ft 8 in)	77	82×61.7 mm (3.23×2.43 in)	500 g (18 oz)	
Zenzanon-PS	65	f/4.0–22	9e/7g	62°	0.6 m (2 ft 0 in)	67	82×69.6 mm (3.23×2.74 in)	665 g (23.5 oz)	
Normal lenses
Zenzanon-S	75~150	f/4.5–32	15e/13g	29~55°	1.8 m (5 ft 11 in)	Ser.9a	100×163 mm (3.9×6.4 in)	1,800 g (63 oz)	
Zenzanon-PS Variogon	75~150	f/4.5–32	15e/13g	29~55°	0.25 m (9.8 in)	Ser.9a	100×152 mm (3.9×6.0 in)	1,800 g (63 oz)	
Zenzanon-S	80	f/2.8–22	6e/4g	52°	0.8 m (2 ft 7 in)	67	82×52 mm (3.2×2.0 in)	470 g (17 oz)	
Zenzanon-PS	80	f/2.8–22	6e/5g	52°	0.8 m (2 ft 7 in)	67	82×52 mm (3.2×2.0 in)	490 g (17 oz)	
Zenzanon-S	105	f/3.5–22	6e/4g	41°	0.85 m (2 ft 9 in)	67	82×60 mm (3.2×2.4 in)	540 g (19 oz)	
Macro Zenzanon-PS	110	f/4.0–32	6e/4g	39°	0.66 m (2 ft 2 in)	67	83×79 mm (3.3×3.1 in)	685 g (24.2 oz)	
Portrait lenses
Zenzanon-PS	135	f/4.0–32	6e/5g	32°	1.0 m (3 ft 3 in)	67	83×79 mm (3.3×3.1 in)	755 g (26.6 oz)	
Zenzanon-S	140~280	f/5.6–32	17e/14g	16~31°	2.5 m (8 ft 2 in)	Ser.9a	90×232 mm (3.5×9.1 in)	2,000 g (71 oz)	
Zenzanon-PS Variogon	140~280	f/5.6–32	17e/14g	16~31°	0.76 m (2 ft 6 in)	Ser.9a	94×221 mm (3.7×8.7 in)	2,000 g (71 oz)	
Zenzanon-S	150	f/3.5–22	5e/5g	29°	1.5 m (4 ft 11 in)	67	82×61 mm (3.2×2.4 in)	590 g (21 oz)	
Zenzanon-PS	150	f/4.0	6e/4g	29°	1.5 m (4 ft 11 in)	67	83×74 mm (3.3×2.9 in)	750 g (26 oz)	
Zenzanon-PS	180	f/4.5	9e/8g	25°	1.0 m (3 ft 3 in)	67	83×96 mm (3.3×3.8 in)	865 g (30.5 oz)	
Zenzanon-S	200	f/4.5–32	5e/5g	22°	2.5 m (8 ft 2 in)	67	82×97 mm (3.2×3.8 in)	740 g (26 oz)	
Zenzanon-PS	200	f/4.5–32	7e/5g	22°	2.5 m (8 ft 2 in)	67	83×107 mm (3.3×4.2 in)	870 g (31 oz)	
Zenzanon-S	250	f/5.6–32	5e/5g	18°	3.0 m (9.8 ft)	67	82×129 mm (3.2×5.1 in)	870 g (31 oz)	
Zenzanon-PS	250	f/5.6–45	7e/5g	18°	3.0 m (9.8 ft)	67	83×150.2 mm (3.27×5.91 in)	1,010 g (36 oz)	
Telephoto lenses
Zenzanon-S	500	f/8.0–45	5e/5g	9°	8.5 m (28 ft)	95	102×255 mm (4.0×10.0 in)	1,890 g (67 oz)	
Zenzanon-PS	500	f/8.0–64	11e/10g	9°	8.0 m (26.2 ft)	122	139×307.5 mm (5.47×12.11 in)	3,760 g (133 oz)	
Teleconverters
Tele-Converter S 2×	2×	+2	6e/5g	approx. 1/2	no change	—N/a	84×53 mm (3.3×2.1 in)	500 g (18 oz)	
Tele-Converter PS 2×	2×	+2	7e/6g	approx. 1/2	no change	—N/a	84×64.4 mm (3.31×2.54 in)	600 g (21 oz)	
Tele-Converter PS 1.4×	1.4×	+1	5e/5g	approx. 1/1.4	no change	—N/a	84×29 mm (3.3×1.1 in)	370 g (13 oz)	

=== GS series ===
Bronica GS-1 (6×7 format, leaf shutter)
Camera Spec.		GS
Camera Spec.		Zenza Bronica GS-1 6×7 SLR camera with lens, Speed Grip, back, prism finder, and system boxes.
Dates	Intro.	Apr 1983
Dates	Disc.	Jun 2002
Image (W×H)		55.6×69.0 mm (2.19×2.72 in)
Shutter	Control	Electronic, leaf
Shutter	Speeds	B,T+16-1/500
Shutter	X-sync	1/500
Dims.	W×L×H	106.5×196.5×116 mm (4.19×7.74×4.57 in) 106.5×80×99 mm (4.19×3.15×3.90 in)
Dims.	Wgt.	1,830 g (65 oz) 630 g (22 oz)
Notes		

Like the contemporary ETRS (645) and SQ-A (6×6) SLRs, the GS-1 is a modular 6×7 format camera system introduced in 1983 featuring the same basic design of a body accepting interchangeable lenses, viewfinders, and film backs, with electronically-timed in-lens leaf shutters. The GS-1 offers aperture-priority autoexposure with the AE Prism Finder G or the AE Rotary Finder G, two of the four interchangeable viewfinders alongside the standard Waist-Level Finder G and the un-metered Prism Finder G. Film backs were offered for both 120 and 220 rollfilm in 6×7, 6×6, and 6×4.5 formats. In addition, a Polaroid Film Back was offered. Although two 135 film backs were listed in the camera manual (for 24×36 and 24×69 frame sizes), these never were released. A dedicated Speed Grip (for the right hand, incorporating a winding lever) and Universal Grip (for the left hand, to eliminate interference with the winding crank) and Speed Light G1 completed the primary accessory list.

The GS-1 uses "PG"-series lenses in a variety of focal lengths: 50mm, 65mm, 80mm, 100mm, 110mm macro, 150mm, 200mm, 250mm, and 500mm.

Lenses for Bronica GS series
Name	FL	Ap.	Const.	Angle	Min. focus	Filt.	Φ×L	Wgt.	Notes
Wide angle lenses
Zenzanon-PG	50	f/4.5–22	11e/8g	83°	0.5 m (1 ft 8 in)	95	98×74 mm (3.9×2.9 in)	790 g (28 oz)	
Zenzanon-PG	65	f/4.0–22	9e/7g	69°	0.6 m (2 ft 0 in)	72	87×71.0 mm (3.43×2.80 in)	715 g (25.2 oz)	
Normal lenses
Zenzanon-PG	80	f/3.5–22	8e/6g	58°	0.55 m (1 ft 10 in)	72	87×71.5 mm (3.43×2.81 in)	755 g (26.6 oz)	
Zenzanon-PG	100	f/3.5–22	6e/4g	48°	0.75 m (2 ft 6 in)	72	87×67.5 mm (3.43×2.66 in)	630 g (22 oz)	
Macro Zenzanon-PG	110	f/4.0–32	6e/4g	44°	0.66 m (2 ft 2 in)	72	87×78.5 mm (3.43×3.09 in)	725 g (25.6 oz)	
Portrait lenses
Zenzanon-PG	150	f/3.5–22	5e/5g	33°	1.5 m (4 ft 11 in)	72	87×62 mm (3.4×2.4 in)	650 g (23 oz)	
Zenzanon-PG	150	f/4.0–22	5e/5g	33°	1.5 m (4 ft 11 in)	72	87×62 mm (3.4×2.4 in)	650 g (23 oz)	
Zenzanon-PG	200	f/4.5–32	5e/5g	25°	2.5 m (8 ft 2 in)	82	87×97.5 mm (3.43×3.84 in)	970 g (34 oz)	
Zenzanon-PG	250	f/5.6–32	6e/5g	20°	3.0 m (9.8 ft)	82	87×142 mm (3.4×5.6 in)	1,200 g (42 oz)	
Telephoto lenses
Zenzanon-PG	500	f/8.0–64	11e/10g	10°	8.0 m (26.2 ft)	122	139×307.5 mm (5.47×12.11 in)	3,760 g (133 oz)	
Teleconverters
Tele-Converter G 2×	2×	+2	7e/6g	approx. 1/2	no change	—N/a	88×67 mm (3.5×2.6 in)	680 g (24 oz)	
Tele-Converter G 1.4×	1.4×	+1	5e/5g	approx. 1/1.4	no change	—N/a	88×32.5 mm (3.46×1.28 in)	420 g (15 oz)	

=== RF series ===
Bronica RF645 (645 rangefinder, leaf shutter)
Camera Spec.		RF645
Dates	Intro.	May 2000
Dates	Disc.	Sep 2005
Image (W×H)		41.5×56 mm (1.63×2.20 in)
Shutter	Control	Electronic, leaf
Shutter	Speeds	B+1-1/500 (to 8 s in AE/P)
Shutter	X-sync	1/500
Dims.	W×D×H	145.6×64×107.3 mm (5.73×2.52×4.22 in)
Dims.	Wgt.	810 g (29 oz)
Notes		

The RF645 was introduced in 2000; it is an extremely light and compact 6×4.5 cm film format coupled rangefinder camera system with a dedicated flash (RF20) and special polarizer kit. Both aperture-priority and program autoexposure modes are available in addition to manual, center-weighted metering. Two CR2-type 3 V lithium batteries are required for camera operation.

Bronica released four interchangeable lenses with leaf shutters for the RF645: 45mm, 65mm, 100mm, and 135mm. When the 65 and 135 mm lenses are attached, the appropriate frames are automatically selected in the camera's viewfinder; the 45 mm lens requires an accessory viewfinder. The in-body frame lines automatically compensate for parallax when the lens is focused closer. The 135 mm telephoto lens soon was discontinued as it was difficult to focus accurately, and later RF645 cameras include framelines for the 100 mm lens instead, with the difference noted in the first digit of the serial number.

Lenses for Bronica RF
Name	FL	Ap.	Const.	Angle	Min. focus	Filt.	Φ×L	Wgt.	Notes
Wide angle lenses
Zenzanon-RF	45	f/4.0–32	7e/5g	76°	1.0 m (3 ft 3 in)	58	76×43.9 mm (2.99×1.73 in)	330 g (12 oz)	
Normal lenses
Zenzanon-RF	65	f/4.0–32	6e/4g	56°	1.0 m (3 ft 3 in)	58	76×43.9 mm (2.99×1.73 in)	300 g (11 oz)	
Portrait lenses
Zenzanon-RF	100	f/4.5–32	7e/6g	38°	1.8 m (5 ft 11 in)	62	76×83.5 mm (2.99×3.29 in)	450 g (16 oz)	
Zenzanon-RF	135	f/4.5–32	6e/5g	29°	1.8 m (5 ft 11 in)	62	77×85.3 mm (3.03×3.36 in)	540 g (19 oz)	
