= Fumée =

Fumée (French: smoke) may refer to:

- Fumée (company)
- Fumée, song by Reynaldo Hahn (1875-1947)
- ...à la Fumée, composition by Kaija Saariaho

== See also ==
- Fumee Lake
- For the general term in cooking, see smoked
