= Cigar case =

Cigar carrier

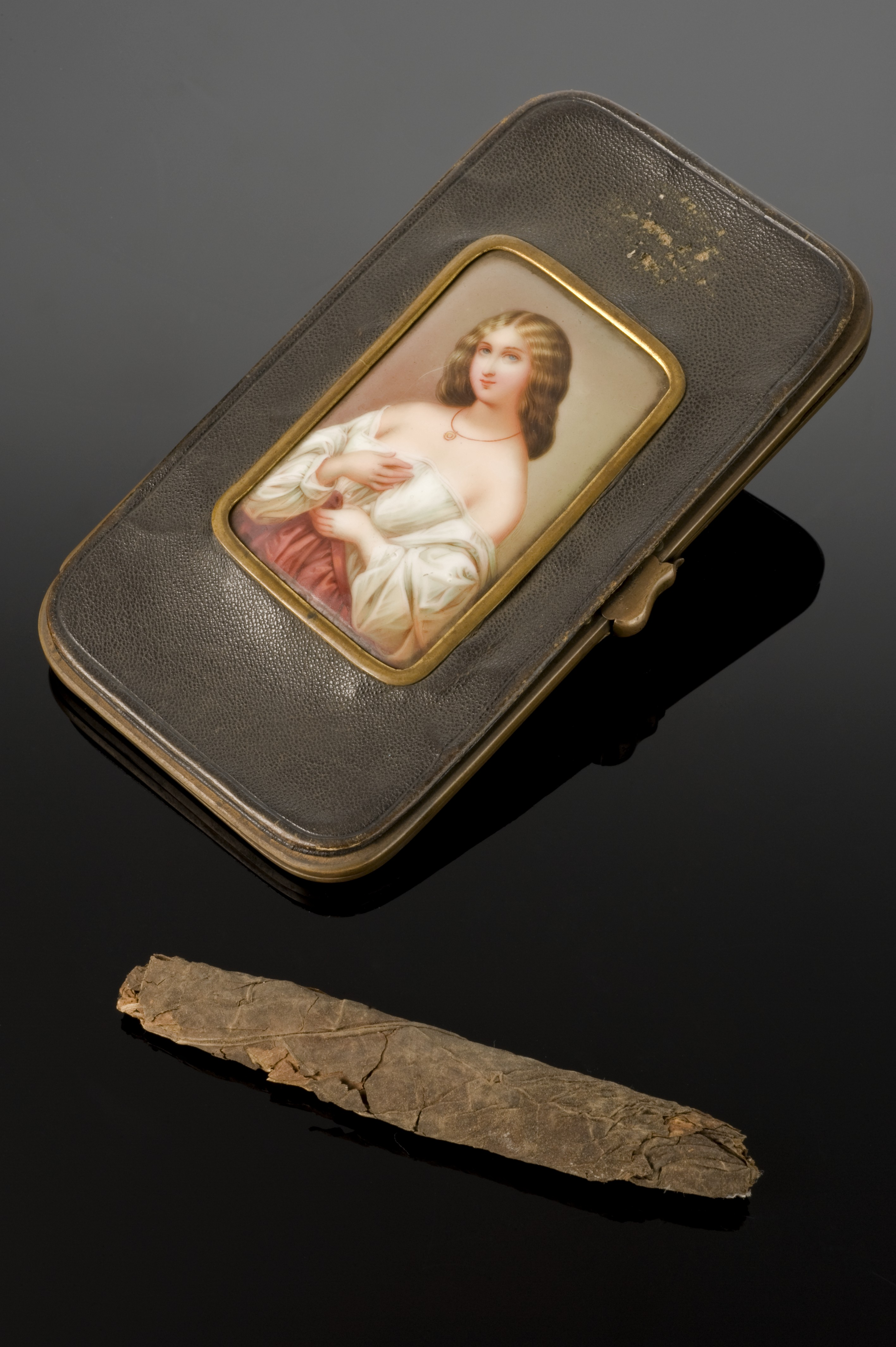
A French cigar case and cigar from the 1840s

A cigar case is a carrier for carrying cigars. The key aspect of a cigar case is its portability, and ease of carrying cigars in jacket pockets, etc. Over the years cigar cases have evolved from a simple wooden carrier to a luxurious tote, fully cedar lined to retain the humidity of cigars.

The leather cigar case has evolved over the past 20 years, from a soft leather pouch to a hard-leather safe. Some provided a slot for a cutter.

== Types of cigar cases ==
Based on construction and accessibility cigar cases are often categorised as follows:

=== Spanish cedar lined cases ===
As the name suggests, these have an lining made of Spanish cedar. These are usually stronger cases, and can withstand impact without damaging the cigars. These cases have two parts; top and bottom. Depending upon construction, one part slides onto the other. The degree of sliding can be adjusted to fit the length of the cigar.

=== Telescopic cigar cases ===
These cases have grooves to fit the cigars. These are usually sliding cases, as the top can be adjusted to the bottom in a telescoping fashion. Usually, these cases do not have a cedar lining and are of relatively soft construction. The shell of the case is usually leather, which is creased against a die matching the ring gauge of the cigar to create the shape of the case. The forms include steel and silver.

== Notable cigar case brands ==
- Alfred Dunhill
- Andre Garcia
- Atoll Cigar Case
- Craftsman Bench
- Davidoff
- Diamond Crown
- Noro Cigar Case
- Porsche Designs
- Prometheus
- Savinelli
- Savoy
- St. Dupont
- Xikar

== See also ==
- Cigarette case
