= Famous Smoke Shop =

American cigar mail order business

Coordinates: 40°44′24″N 75°13′24″W

- Company type: Retail
- Founded: New York, New York, U.S. (October 1939; 86 years ago)
- Headquarters: Easton
- Products: Cigars & Cigar Accessories
- Owner: Arthur Zaretsky
- Parent: Famous Smoke Shop-PA, Inc.
- Website: https://www.famous-smoke.com

Famous Smoke Shop is one of the largest cigar mail order businesses in the United States. The company was formed in October, 1939 in Midtown Manhattan as a cigar and gift shop. In 2000, increasing rents and taxes forced the company to move its operations to Easton, Pennsylvania, a state that currently imposes no cigar tax. Famous Smoke Shop is engaged primarily in the retail and wholesale of cigars, humidors, and cigar accessories through mail order catalogs, a brick and mortar retail shop, and several websites.

== Incorporation and growth ==
Famous Smoke Shop's original retail store located at 1433 Broadway, New York City, founded in 1939.

David and Rose Zaretsky incorporated Famous Smoke Shop in New York City in October 1939. In 1970, their son Arthur Zaretsky began working for the company. He assumed sole ownership in 1984.

Famous Smoke Shop has maintained a brick and mortar retail shop since its incorporation. The original shop was located at 1433 Broadway in New York City. The 350 sq. ft. store primarily sold imported and domestic cigars, as well as magazines and other sundries. In 1975, the company moved to a 550 sq. ft. location at 1450 Broadway. In 1986, unable to absorb increasing Midtown rents, the company moved its cigar store to a 1550 sq. ft. location at 55 W. 39th Street. Its current retail shop is located in the north end of its 24,000 sq. ft. Easton headquarters.

In 1970, Famous Smoke Shop published its first mail order cigar catalog. The catalog consisted of a typewritten pricelist of available cigar brands. The catalog is currently produced in-house by a staff of copywriters and graphic artists, and mailed monthly.

Between the years of 1992 and 1998, the cigar industry experienced an unprecedented boom. Cigar sales increased by as much as 36% in the first quarter of 1996. Increased sales during this period provided the company enough capital to upgrade its telephone and computer systems. During this period, the company also diversified its marketing efforts, expanding its catalog and developing a web presence.

Famous-Smoke.com was first published in 1997. The company now markets cigars through several web properties. In 2004, the company published an online auction website, CigarAuctioneer.com, which sells humidors, lighters, cigar cutters and cases to the highest bidder(s). In December, 2006 it published CigarMonster.com, a one deal a day website. It also operates CigarDomain.com, a cigar wholesale website.

== Cigar manufacturing ==
Famous Smoke Shop is the sole owner and distributor of numerous cigar brands manufactured on its behalf by Rocky Patel, Padrón, La Aurora, and Don José "Pepin" Garcia, among others.

== See also ==
- JR Cigars
- Thompson Cigar
- Fumée
