= Fumée (company) =

American cigar media and online retailer

Fumée Inc.
- Company type: Private
- Industry: Cigar
- Founded: 2006
- Defunct: 2011
- Headquarters: Cedar Park, Texas, United States
- Key people: Heather Waibel, Founder and President

Fumée Inc. was a cigar media and online retailer based in Cedar Park, Texas. It sold premium cigars and distributed cigar related media through its website. It was founded in 2006 by Heather Waibel and incorporated in Texas in 2007. Fumée is notable in that it was one of the few cigar related companies headed by a woman, (others include Heavenly Cigars founded by Heather L. Phillips and Up Down Cigar owned by Diana Silvius).

Unlike many brick and mortar operations that since the late 1990s have become online merchants, Fumée's goal was the opposite, they started as an e-commerce operation with the stated goal of branching into the brick and mortar business. In 2006 Heather Waibel campaigned against Proposition 86 of California that would have raised tobacco taxes in the state.

Fumée Inc. also produced a podcast that interviewed industry insiders. These have included Rocky Patel of Indian Tabac, Charlie Toraño of Toraño Cigars, Alan Rubin of Alec Bradley, Ernesto Padilla of Padilla Cigars, Kinky Friedman of Kinky Friedman Cigars, Steve Saka of Drew Estate, and David Blanco of Los Blancos Cigars. The podcast has been named by the blog The Mind of Men as one of their favorites.

Fumée closed in December 2011.

== See also ==
- List of cigar brands
- Famous Smoke Shop
- JR Cigars
- Thompson Cigar
