= Andre Garcia =

Andre Garcia may refer to:

- Andre Garcia (brand), a luxury cigar case brand
- Andre Garcia (actor) (born 1999), Filipino actor
- André Luís Garcia (born 1979), Brazilian footballer
- Andre Garcia (footballer) (born 2007), English footballer

== See also ==
- Andrés García (disambiguation)
