= Thompson Group Inc. =

- Company type: Private
- Industry: Retail
- Genre: Catalog Mail-Order & ECommerce
- Founded: 1915
- Founder: Robert Franzblau
- Defunct: 2010
- Headquarters: 5401 Hangar Court. Tampa, FL 33634
- Key people: Robert Franzblau (CEO), Carlo Franzblau (Shareholder), and Alix Franzblau (Shareholder and former CEO of Casual Living and Linen Source)
- Owner: Robert Franzblau
- Website: http://www.thompsoncigar.com

Thompson Group was the parent company to Thompson Cigar that was based in Tampa, Florida and encompassed Casual Living and Linen Source. Thompson Group's headquarters was located at 5401 Hangar Court in Town and Country, Florida.

== Governance ==
Thompson Group was owned and operated by Robert Franzblau and children Alix Franzblau and Carlo Franzblau.

== LinenSource ==
LinenSource was bought in 1991, originally named Country Made Curtains specializing in drapes and curtains exclusively. Expansion of LinenSource led the business to broaden their inventory to all home textiles. LinenSource was sold to Orchard Brands in March 2010.

== Casual Living USA ==
Casual Living USA was acquired in 1990, and sold novelty gifts and women's apparel. Casual Living USA was under the administration of Alix Franzblau, CEO. Casual living was sold in April 2010 to Boston Apparel Group.

== Dissolution ==
Following the sale of Casual Living and Linen Source, Thompson Group dissolved as Thompson Cigar was the only business owned and operated by the Franzblau Family under the Thompson Group umbrella.

== See also ==
Thompson Cigar
