= Andre Garcia (brand) =

Luxury goods brand

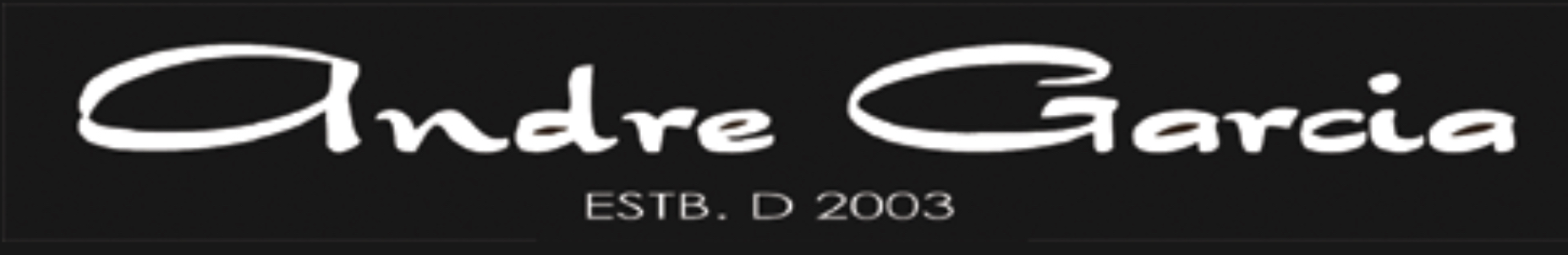
- Company type: Private
- Traded as: Andre Garcia
- Industry: Luxury goods
- Founded: 2003
- Founder: Abhik Roy
- Headquarters: United States, India
- Area served: Worldwide
- Key people: Abhik Roy (Founder)
- Parent: Ash & Burn, LLC, USA
- Website: andregarciacases.com

Andre Garcia is a luxury leather product and cigar brand owned by brothers, Abhik Roy and Anindya Roy.

== The Brand ==
Andre Garcia is a luxury leather product and cigar brand owned by US-based Ash & Burn, a company co-promoted by brothers, Abhik Roy from Calcutta India and Anindya Roy, in 2003.

Until the creation of the Andre Garcia line in 2003, Roy and his artisans toiled in relative anonymity, making cases that carried the brand names of other companies in its factory in Calcutta, India. Roy was the first to introduce a wide variety and style in cigar cases in an otherwise stagnant cigar case market.

Andre Garcia brand's guiding principle was one size does not fit all. Roy engineered a spectrum of sizes to accommodate anything from a short trip, for which one might like a solo smoke, to a party, at which one intends to offer cigars to all the guys. Striving for multiplicity, Andre Garcia crafted 1—, 2—, 4—, 5—, 6—, 8—, 10—, 16— and 20—finger cases in various designs, leather grains, dimensions, and colors, as well as widths and lengths. Andre Garcia cigar cases come in about 50 types and sizes, all leather and cedar-lined—and often capped with buffalo horn. Some of the cases comes in their zipper-top ^{patented} IN granted 329278, Roy Abhik, "Cigar Case", published 2009-05-15, assigned to Roy Abhik US pending PCT/US2007/072911, Ash & Burn, LLC, "Cigar Case", published 2008-01-01, assigned to Roy Abhik Manhattan or Buffalo Horn styles.

As an alternative to a typical leather case, from which the top simply slides off the company innovated in introducing a unique zipper—enclosed top^{patented} and cases with a passive humidification system under its Pack & Go Travel Humidor series. Resembling an executive men’s tote, the case opens to reveal a cedar-lined cigar chamber with collapsible wooden columns dividers to keep cigars in their upright position. The urbane design incorporates a humidification stick neatly hidden in the bottom compartment. Its lower portion unzips, making it easy to refill the device. The top unzips for your cigars. A ventilated cedar floor separates the two, allowing for moisture to rise into the main storage chamber. The company first introduced the concept of Cigar Briefcase for travelers.

The brand received press coverage in several leading cigar journals such as Robb Report European Cult, Cigar Aficionado Vintage Luxe, Smoke, etc.

The company first introduced the concept of Cigar Briefcase for travelers.

== Products and other ventures ==
In the present day, the company produces cigar cases and leather accessories, totes, and attachés for cigar enthusiasts to carry cigars and accessories as well as general-purpose luxury leather bags with more than 150 designs, including products made from carbon fibre and others from imported Bavarian leather, while the inners are lined by imported Spanish cedarwood. under its private label and also produces cases for other brands such as Cohiba. "The 5 by 54 cigars in the case aren't available outside of this set," said Bill Chilian, director of marketing for General Cigar. When we considered this project, we looked for someone whose work is worthy of our Cohiba label. Andre Garcia was one of those companies. The case is wrapped in a black tanned, high-grade leather, trimmed with silver stitching and fashioned with a chrome finish brass top."

Andre Garcias are the first cigars to be made exclusively for Indian market. The cigars are available in a wide range of sizes and flavors.

The fillers are sourced from Nicaragua, Honduras, and the Dominican Republic.

== History ==
In 2000, Abhik Roy attended the Ambiente Trade Fair in Frankfurt, Germany to showcase his cigar-case designs. Robert Franzblau, found and president of Thompson Cigar, noticed his designs and encouraged Roy to pursue his designs. Upon his return to India, Roy left his prior manufacturing job to pursue cigar case production as a full-time entrepreneur.

Roy leveraged his knowledge of manufacturing and international marketing and exporting to produce cigar cases marketed to global luxury product companies. He designed his product line to fill perceived gaps and lack of innovation in the existing product offerings.

In May 2000, Abhik started a manufacturing unit at his family-owned ancestral home with around 75 craftsmen in Kolkata. The workshop produced cigar cases that carried the brand names of other companies and were subsequently sold by respected retailers and cigar companies, both in the US and Europe.

Between 2000 and 2003, the Kolkata unit was producing exclusive cedar-lined cases for global brands such as Davidoff, Dunhill, Thompson, Cohiba, Macanudo, and Swedish Match.

Around November 2003, these companies, working on Roy's recommendation, started marketing cigars in premium cigar cases instead of plain boxes, which brought in much better revenues and great volumes for Roy. After spending three years producing cases for other companies, Roy decided to start his own label of luxury cigar cases.

Roy and his brother Anindya Roy christened their new brand "Andre Garcia", seeking a name that would be readily identifiable internationally. The name "Garcia" comes from the US/UK military airbase NSF Diego Garcia.

In its first year itself, Andre Garcia sold 160,000 cigar cases. Each of the cigar case designs is patented by Abhik Roy.

The Andre Garcia brand produces more than 150 cigar case designs. The cases are sold at luxury stores and tobacconists throughout Europe and the United States.
