= JR Cigars =

Tobacco retailer

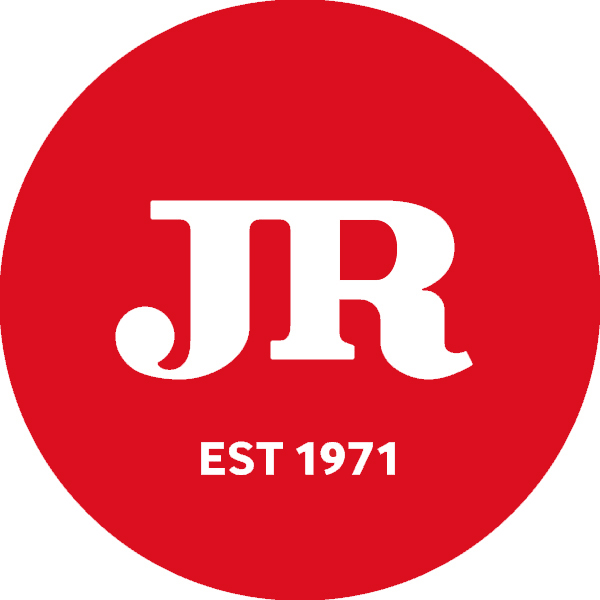
- Website: jrcigars.com

800-JR Cigar, Inc., more commonly known as JR Cigar or JRCigars.com, is one of the largest wholesalers and retailers of cigars, cigar related products and pipe tobacco in the United States. The company originated as a cigar shop in Manhattan but now chiefly operates through on-line and catalog sales; however, the company maintains three retail outlets in North Carolina, two in New Jersey (Whippany with Executive Offices, and Paramus), as well as a retail locations in Manhattan (closed), Washington DC, and Detroit, MI.

The company previously traded on the NASDAQ under the trading symbol JRJR after an initial public offering in 1997. The Spanish company Altadis S.A. acquired a 51% controlling interest in the company in 2003. The company continues to operate as a subsidiary of Altadis.

The company has been prosecuting significant litigation against GoTo.com (Now Overture / Yahoo - The first to bring on Pay for Placement on a search engine) on the issue of whether the use of a trademark as a paid keyword in search engine advertisement constitutes trademark infringement. To be brief, Goto.com (Overture) was selling keywords such as "JR Cigars", "JR Cigar", and other variations of "JR Cigar" to competing cigar retailers - thus "illegally diverting traffic" from a trademarked name to other sites. In the latest decision, the court held that GoTo had been making a “use” of the trademark “in commerce”, but concluded that it was unable to grant summary judgment on the issue of infringement, so that a full trial is necessary.

== See also ==
- List of cigar brands
- Famous Smoke Shop
- Fumee
- Thompson Cigar
