= Andrés García (disambiguation) =

Andrés García (1941–2023) was a Mexican actor.

Andrés García may also refer to:

== Sportspeople ==
- Andrés García (fencer) (born 1967), Spanish Olympic fencer
- Andrés García (footballer, born 1984), Spanish football manager and former defender
- Andrés García (footballer, born 1996), Spanish football midfielder
- Andrés García (footballer, born 2003), Spanish football winger

== Others ==
- Andrés García-Peña (born 1961), Colombian-American painter
- Andrés García, Colombian singer in rock band Ekhymosis
- Andrés García La Calle (1909–1980), Spanish squadron leader
- Andrés Xavier García (born 1686), Jesuit missionary to New Spain
- Andy García (Andrés Arturo García), American actor, director and producer

== See also ==
- Andre Garcia (disambiguation)
