= Andrés García-Peña =

Colombian-American painter

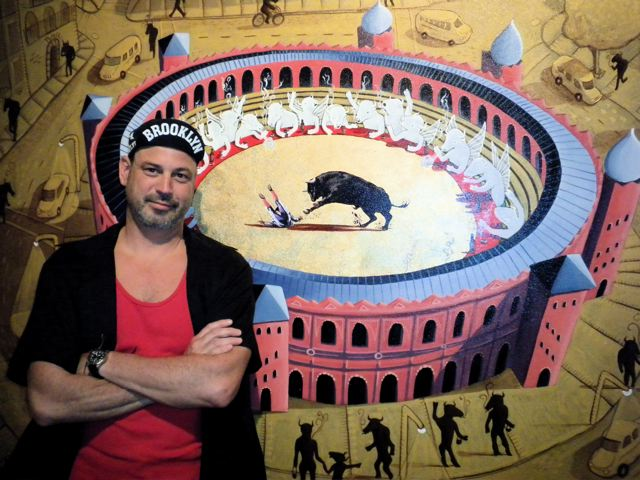
- Born: 1961 (age 64–65); Milan, Italy
- Known for: Painter
- Movement: Surrealism
- Website: andresgarciapena.com

Andrés García-Peña is a Colombian-American neo-expressionist painter living and working in New York City. His paintings revolve around scenes of Colombian cultural heritage. Andrés García-Peña started his career in New York City as a muralist in the East Village, Manhattan art scene of the 1980s. Since then he has lived and worked in Barcelona.

== Background ==
García-Peña was born in Milan to Colombian parents. He was later educated as an artist at Florida State University from 1980 to 1982. He moved to New York City at age 20. To support his art, he took a second job rowing a gondola in Central Park. García-Peña became known as the "Central Park Gondolier", as he was the last rower working at the Central Park Boathouse. He continued to row after gaining more prominence as an artist.

=== Art ===
García-Peña has exhibited internationally, with solo shows in Mexico, Colombia, Holland, Spain, Sweden and throughout the United States. He continues to work extensively in public art and has recently completed commissions for the Children's Aid Society in New York City. He has worked extensively on paintings depicting the theme of bullfighting from the bull's point of view.
