= Cigarette case =

Decorative container for cigarettes

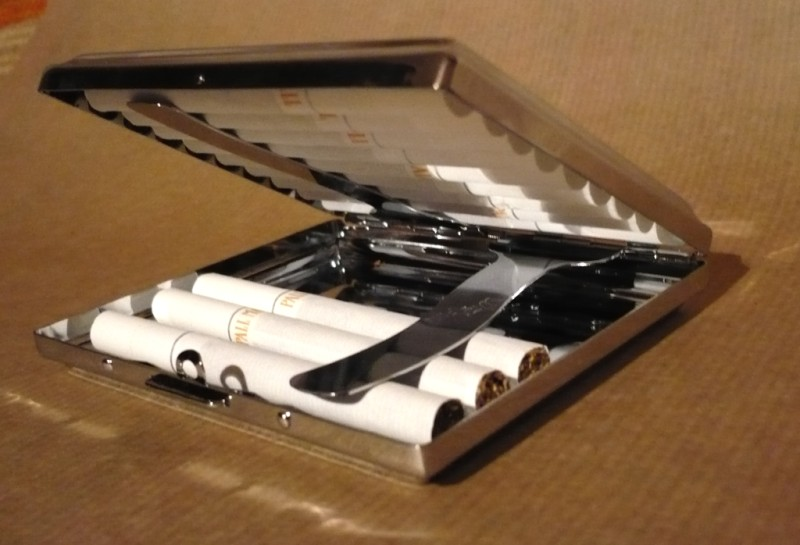
Aluminium cigarette case

A cigarette case (sometimes called a cigarette tin) is a sturdy container used to store small numbers of cigarettes and prevent them from being crushed. A typical cigarette case is a flat box (commonly made of metal) that opens symmetrically into two halves. Each half stores a row of cigarettes, which are often held in place by a spring or an elastic strap. Some cigarette cases are simply sturdy cases used to store standard cigarette packs.

== Types and uses ==
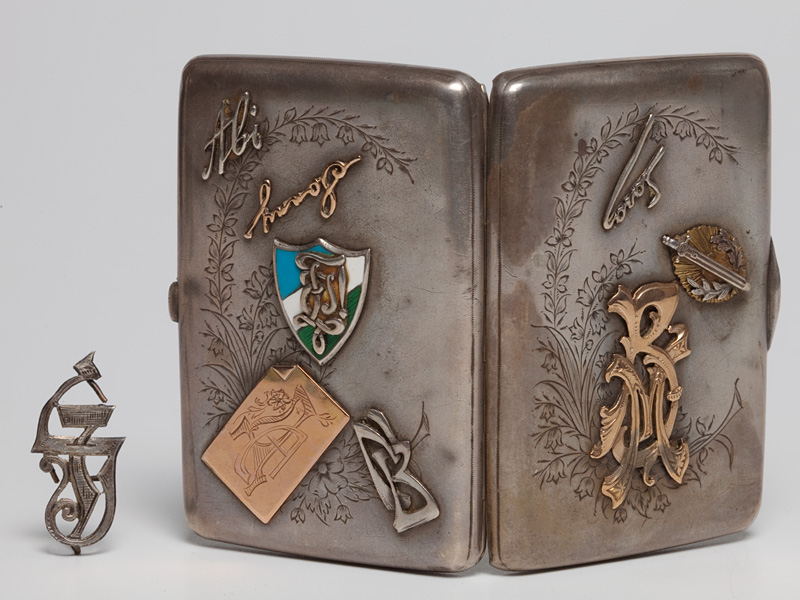
This cigarette case, inscribed with the Zirkel of a Jewish Studentenverbindung, is in the Jewish Museum of Switzerland’s collection.

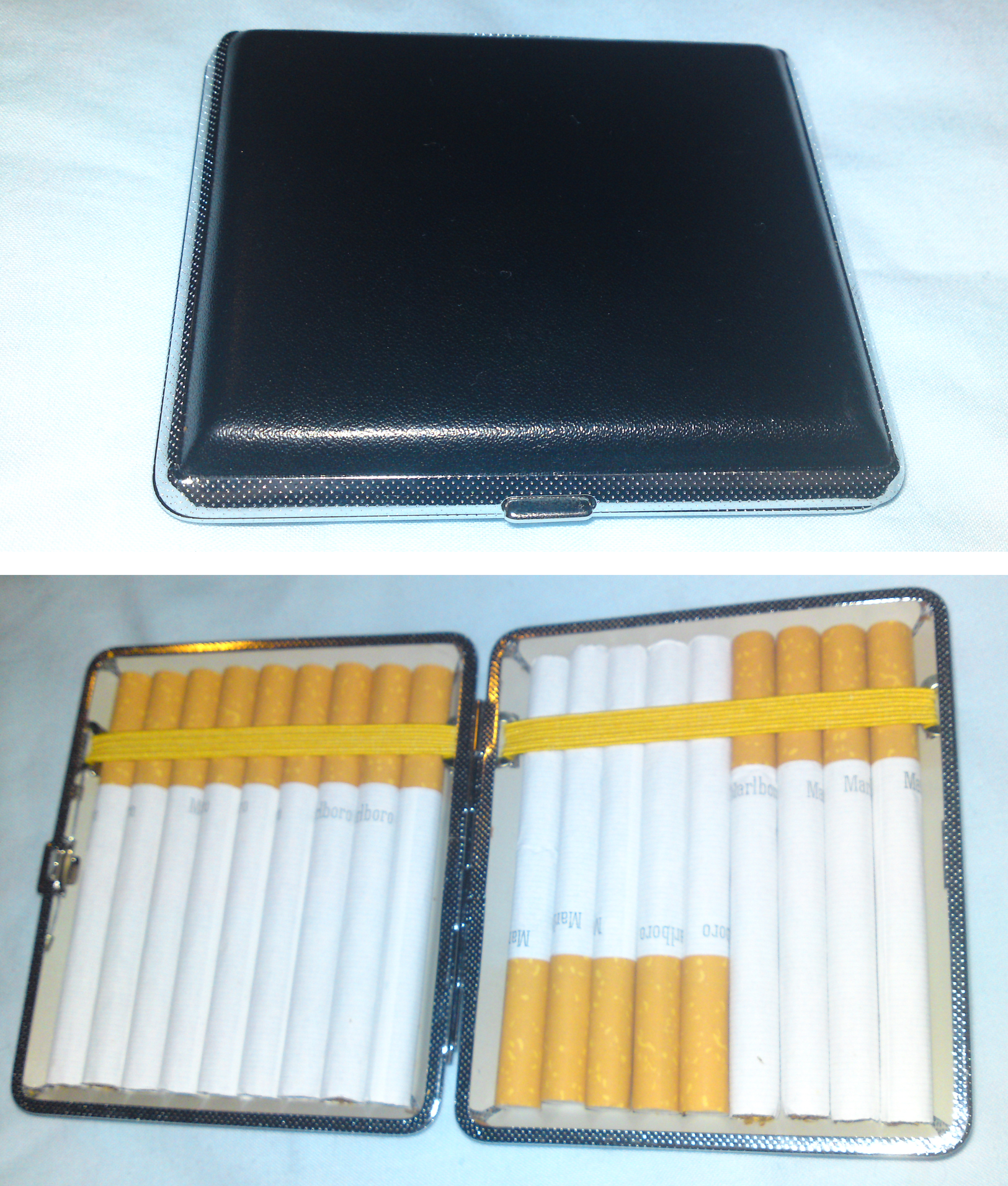
A cigarette case covered in black leather with silver trim, showing the outside and the inside filled with cigarettes.

In modern times cigarette cases are also made of plastic. Some cigarette cases come with additional features, such as built-in lighters or ashtrays. Due to the compactness of a cigarette case, being just small enough to conveniently fit in a pocket, they can also be used to store or conceal other small items.

=== Cigarette boxes ===
A cigarette box, much like a cigar humidor, is a larger case or tin, often stored on desktops or coffee tables. Made of wood, metal, glass, or ceramic, a cigarette box holds a larger number of cigarettes for use by the homeowner and guests.

Typical cigarette tins of this type in the United States of the 1920s–1930s stored 50 cigarettes. Because of this, they were sometimes referred to by the nickname "flat fifties".

== Fashion accessories and collector's items ==
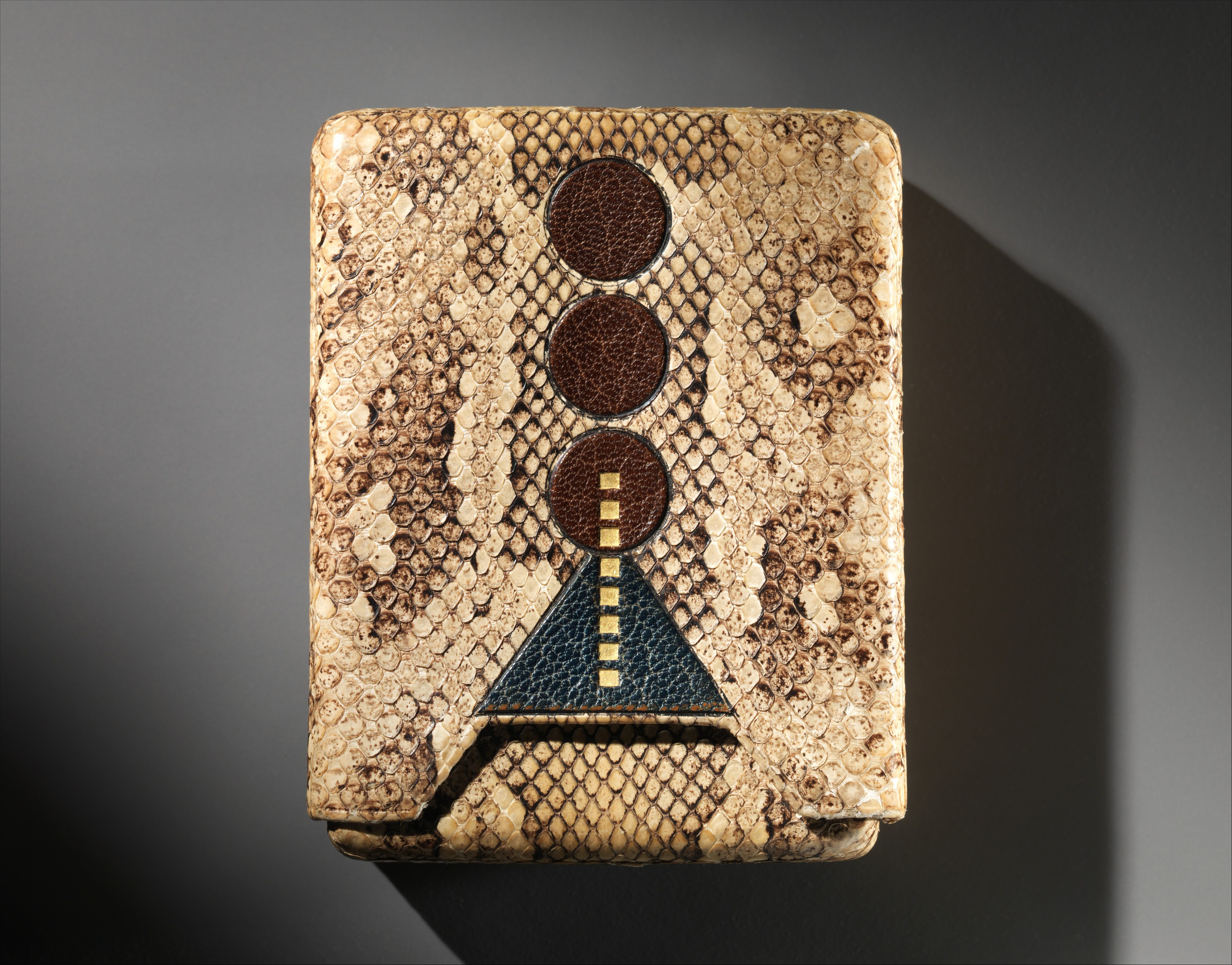
Snake skin cigarette case designed by Pierre Legrain, ca 1925

Cigarette cases are fashionable accessories within smoking culture. As such, they may be made of precious metals, adorned with artistic engravings, monograms, and jewels. Peter Carl Fabergé, while most famous for his Fabergé eggs, also manufactured exquisite cases of gold and gems for the family of the Tsar, some of which (e.g., those owned by Danielle Steel) are reportedly worth up to $25,000.

At the opening of each of his new Broadway productions, Cole Porter's wife, Linda, presented him with a cigarette case from Cartier. They were made in gold, silver or leather, many studded with gems and generally styled to relate to that show's theme. Cigarette cases are also collectible items.

Common "silver cigarette cases" are most often chrome-plated, although there are silver-plated or polished aluminium cases in addition to genuine sterling ones.

The United States Census Bureau, for the purposes of industry statistics, includes manufacturing or adorning of cigarette cases in the category NAICS 339914 "Costume jewelry and novelty manufacturing". In the 19th century they could be attachable to the bracelets of fashionable women.

== History ==
Cigarette cases used to be popular with soldiers, and many World War I and World War II veterans (e.g., James Doohan) stated that cigarette cases saved their lives by stopping bullets.

In 2003 the European Union witnessed a surge in cigarette case sales, attributable to the introduction of prominent black-bordered warning labels on cigarette packs, e.g., "Smokers Die Younger", etc., by an EU directive in January 2003. Cigarette cases were a way to avoid the invasive labels (another way being various satirical stickers, with slogans such as "You could be hit by a bus tomorrow").

== See also ==
- Cigar box
- Cigar case
- Humidor
- TKB-506 (a Soviet noiseless pistol disguised as a cigarette case)
