= Norita =

Japanese optical manufacturer

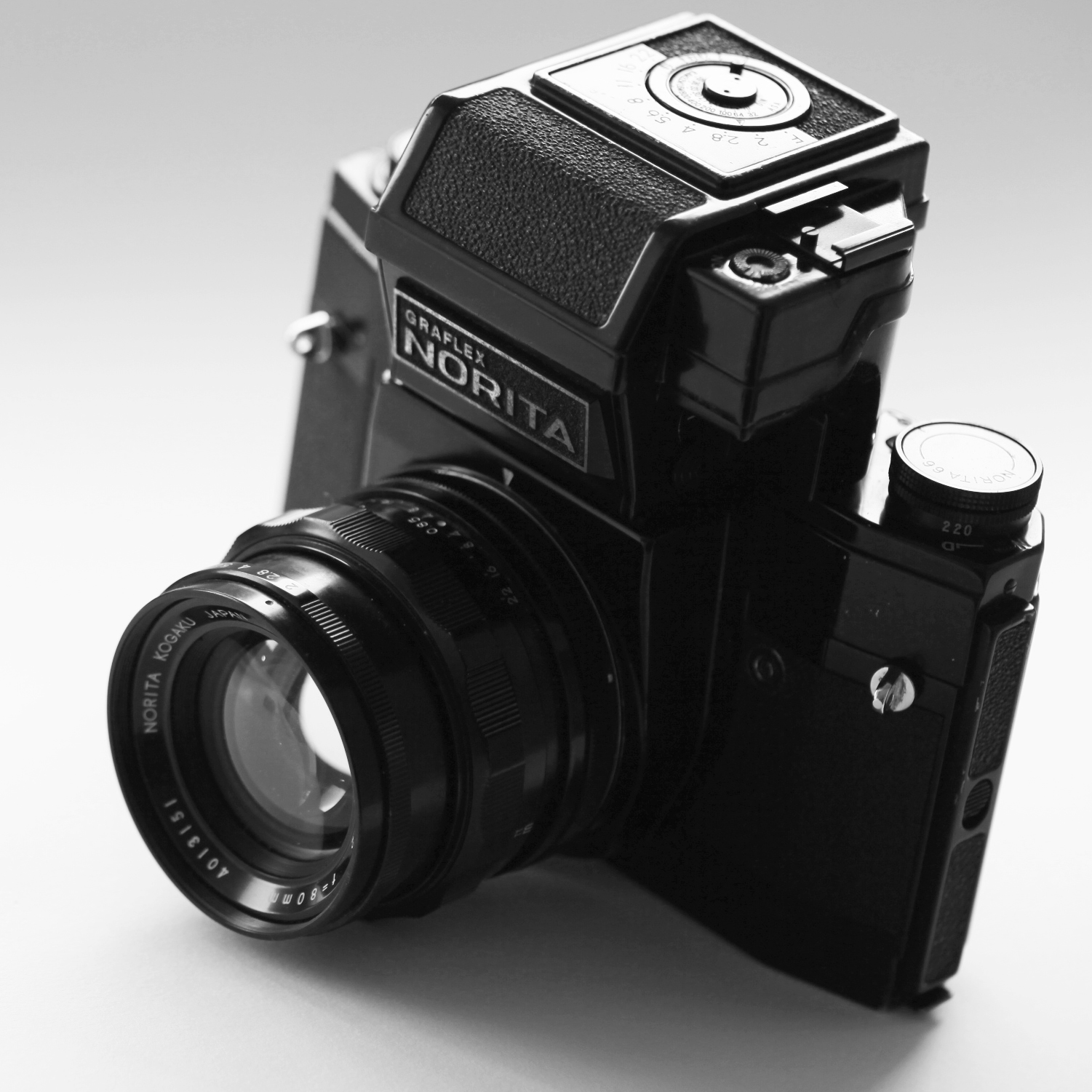
- The Norita 66, marketed in the USA as "Graflex Norita."
- Native name: ノリタ光学
- Industry: Optics
- Founded: 1951
- Founder: Toshio Norita
- Fate: Defunct
- Headquarters: Japan

Norita (ノリタ光学, Norita kōgaku) was a Japanese optical manufacturer. Founded in 1951 by Toshio Norita (車田利夫), it originally made lenses for binoculars but moved on to prisms and thence pentaprisms for SLR cameras.

Musashino Kōki (武蔵野光幾) had been making a 6×6 SLR called the Rittreck 6×6 from 1968; for which Norita had been making the pentaprism finder and the three lenses (wide, standard, and tele). When Musashino decided to terminate production of this camera, Norita decided to expand from being merely an optical designer/manufacturer to manufacturing cameras, and took over machine tools, assembly, and some staff from Musashino.

For its new "Norita 66", Norita expanded the range of lenses: the 55/80/160mm selection for the Rittreck became 40/55/80/160/240/400. Additionally it produced a 75mm f/3.5 lens with built-in shutter (bypassing the focal-plane shutter for high-speed synchronization with electronic flash); the most remarkable lens in the line-up remained the 80mm standard lens with a fast opening of f/2, fast for a medium-format lens. Originally branded Rittron, this lens had been designed and manufactured by Norita from the start. After Norita took over the production of the Rittreck 6x6, it was rebranded as Noritar, but optically remained the same as the original Rittreck 'kit lens'.

Norita tied up with Singer, owner of Graflex, and exported cameras to the US, where they were sold as, and inscribed, "Graflex Norita". Norita also exported cameras to France, West Germany, the Netherlands, and Czechoslovakia. In 1976, the company stopped the production of cameras and camera-related products, but remained in business, making projection lenses and other products. In 1994 Hagiya Takeshi wrote that the Norita products his readers were most likely to encounter were the three (RGB) lenses for large television projectors.

In 2000 Norita Optical Co., Ltd. became an Enplas dependent company and was renamed Enplas Optics Corporation in 2001, but finally closed its doors in 2005.
