= Diamond Crown =

Dominican cigar brand

Diamond Crown is a brand of cigar handmade by Tabacalera A. Fuente in the Dominican Republic for the J.C. Newman Cigar Company.

J.C. Newman originally made this cigar with Cuban tobacco in Cleveland, Ohio, and then Tampa, and Florida in the 1940s, 1950s and 1960s.

In 1995, the Diamond Crown brand was re-launched by the Newman family to commemorate the company's 100th anniversary of cigar making.

== Tobacco ==
- Wrapper: Exclusive Connecticut Fermented Wrapper (CFW)
- Binder: Dominican
- Filler: Dominican

Source: Cigar Cyclopedia
