= Thompson Cigar =

American cigar retailer

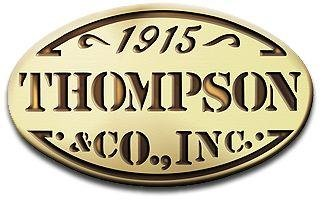
- Type: Public
- Industry: Retail
- Founded: 1915; 111 years ago
- Headquarters: 5401 Hangar Court. Tampa, Florida 33634
- Number of locations: 1
- Products: Cigars & Cigar Accessories
- Parent: Scandinavian Tobacco Group
- Website: thompsoncigar.com

Thompson Cigar Company is a cigar and cigar accessories retailer located in Tampa, Florida. Thompson Cigar is the oldest mail order cigar company in the United States. Originally located in Key West, Florida, Thompson Cigar first opened in 1915. In 1920, after hurricanes decimated most of the cigar factories in Key West, original owner M.A. Thompson moved his factory to Ybor City, located in Tampa, Florida, known as "Cigar Capital of the World." Thompson acquired Postal Permit #1 in the city of Tampa, which it still holds today. In 1934, M.A. Thompson moved his factory to Bartow, Florida where it would remain until 1960.

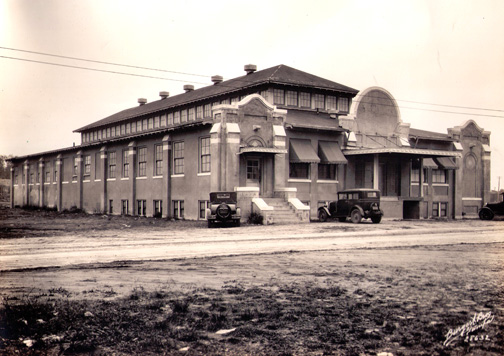
Thompson Cigar Company

== Incorporation and growth ==
In 1960, Thompson Cigar Company was sold to Robert Franzblau. Franzblau relocated cigar production to local Tampa factories such as M & N Cigars and Gradiaz-Annis, which would make cigars under the Thompson brand. Both Stanford Newman and Morton Annis would serve as Franzblau's mentors for many years. Newman bought Cuesta-Rey and Annis owned Gold Label and Macanudo, which he eventually sold to General Cigar Company. Expansion led Franzblau to permanently establish corporate headquarters at 5401 Hangar Court, Tampa, Florida 33634. Today, Thompson Cigar runs the single largest inventory storage humidor in the United States, totaling over 300,000 cubic feet (8,500 m^{3}). Thompson Cigar distributes private label cigars, national cigar brands, boutique cigars, humidors, and smoking accessories.

In 2018, the company was sold to Scandinavian Tobacco Group, a public company based in Denmark.

In 2019 Parent company, Scandinavian Tobacco Group laid off 112 workers and announced the outlet store along with Thompson's other Tampa operations were to close and be centralized in Bethlehem, Pennsylvania as part of its consolidation of operations.

== Initiatives ==
In 2008, Thompson Cigar became a sponsor for Cigars & Guitars, The Tampa History Museum, Thanks Troops Golf Tournament, Southeastern Guides Dogs & Paws for Patriots. Also in 2008, Thompson Cigar announced the donation of over 300,000 cigars to American troops. Troops who received cigars included those in combat areas of Afghanistan and Iraq, plus Korea, the Horn of Africa and three Navy aircraft carrier battle groups. As of January 2015, Thompson Cigar had donated over a million cigars to American troops.

== Operating divisions ==
Thompson Cigar was affiliated with Thompson Group Inc., which was listed #73 on the 2004 Catalog Age top 100 list. Thompson Group was a multi-channel merchant that included Thompson Cigar, Café Belmondo (sold 2008), Casual Living USA (sold 2010), and Linen Source (sold 2010). The company does business in three different catalog and online formats: tobacco, general merchandise, and membership cigar club.

== Customer base ==
Thompson Cigar has over 600,000 active customers nationwide. On average 167,800 people visit its website monthly. Thompson Cigar caters to a 69%, more affluent, male demographic.

They currently hold an "A+" rating with the Better Business Bureau.

== Thompson Retail Websites ==
Thompson & Company of Tampa Inc. owns and operates two retail websites, Thompsoncigar.com and one auction site, Thompsoncigarauctions.com.

Thompsoncigar.com is the premiere site that was launched in 1999. Thompsoncigar.com supports the Thompson Cigar mail order catalog, established in 1915 and the oldest Mail Order cigar company. Thompsoncigar.com offers thousands of cigars from the World's most popular manufacturers.

== Governance ==
Thompson and Company of Tampa is owned by the Scandinavian Tobacco Group.

== See also ==
- Famous Smoke Shop
- JR Cigars
