= St Laurence's Church, Combe Longa =

Coordinates: 51.840°N 1.401°W

St Laurence's Church
- Parish Church of St Laurence, Combe Longa
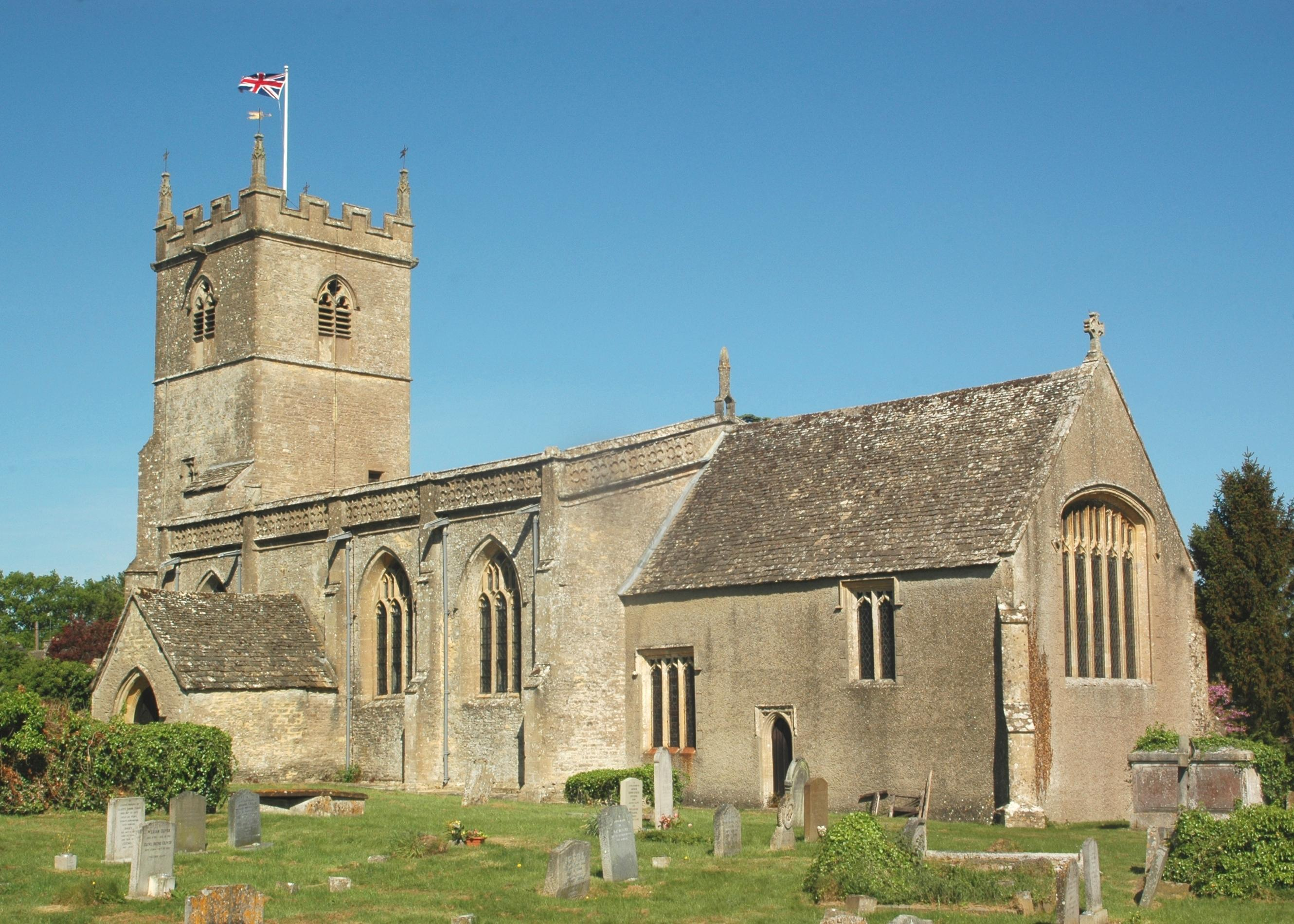
- St Laurence's from the southeast
- St Laurence's Church
- OS grid reference: SP 41387 15879
- Location: Church Walk, Combe, Oxfordshire OX29 8NG
- Country: England
- Denomination: Church of England

History
- Dedication: Laurence of Rome

Architecture
- Heritage designation: Grade I listed
- Designated: 27 August 1957
- Style: Perpendicular Gothic
- Years built: 12th century, late 14th century

Administration
- Province: Canterbury
- Diocese: Oxford
- Archdeaconry: Dorchester
- Deanery: Woodstock

Clergy
- Vicar: Rev Roy Turner

St Laurence's Church, Combe Longa is the Church of England parish church of Combe, Oxfordshire, England. The parish is part of the Benefice of Stonesfield with Combe Longa.

The Wychwood Way long-distance footpath passes the church.

== History ==
A church at Combe existed by about 1141, when the Empress Matilda granted it to the Benedictine Eynsham Abbey. In the Middle Ages, Oxfordshire was part of the Diocese of Lincoln, and in 1478 Thomas Rotherham, Bishop of Lincoln, granted St Laurence's church to Lincoln College, Oxford. The college remains patron of the Living.

Parts of the building are 12th century, including the inner doorway of the north porch. The nave was rebuilt near the end of the 14th century, and is notable for its 14th- or 15th-century stone pulpit and a set of wall paintings dating from about 1440. The church has remnants of a set of 15th-century stained glass windows. The most complete survivor is one on the southeast corner of the nave depicting Saint James the Great. In the tracery at the top of the east window of the chancel survive images of Christ in Majesty with Saint Mary, flanked by cherubim and an angel using a censer.

A west gallery in the nave was built or altered in 1821. Box pews were also introduced in the 1820s. In 1843 they were criticised as "miserable, deal pews" and the church as "white and yellow wash, dirt, and everything most offensive".

=== Restoration ===
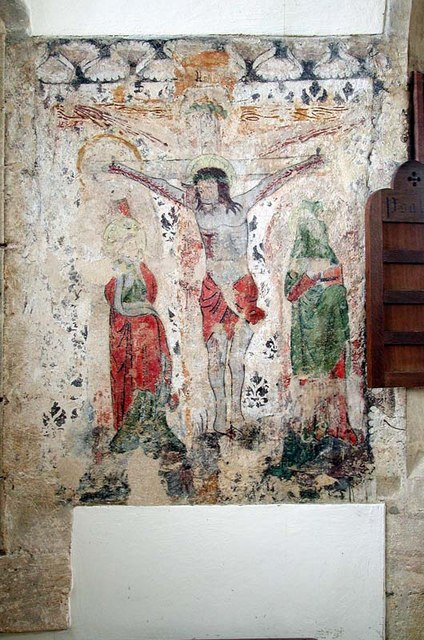
Crucifixion of Jesus, painted about 1440

In 1891 a new vicar, Stephen Pearce, was appointed. He applied himself to parish work and had the church restored and the vicarage rebuilt. The church restoration was begun in 1892, when the west gallery was removed and the 15th-century wall paintings were rediscovered under the limewash on the nave walls. The surviving paintings include an Annunciation on the south wall, a crucifixion of Jesus near the pulpit, and part of a Doom painting over the chancel arch. Also on the south wall is a painting of Saint Christopher, shown with fish and an otter. On the north wall is a painting of Saint Catherine of Alexandria.

In 1892–94 the nave and chancel walls were repaired and the windows were renewed. In 1907–09 the nave roof was extensively repaired. A fire in 1918 gutted the tower, which was restored in 1922. Later restoration included the tower stonework in 1952–55, the chancel roof in 1963, and the surface of the nave roof in 1976.

The 1918 fire destroyed the parish chest and its contents. Some records were in the vicarage and survived, including the parish register from 1646 until 1705, some 19th-century registers, vestry minutes and churchwardens' accounts.

The church is a Grade I listed building.

== Bells and clocks ==
The earliest record of bells at the church is from 1585, when one had recently been cast. This must have been later recast, as in the late 19th century the dates of the bells were recorded as 1602 or 1621, 1628, 1629, 1698 and 1723, forming a ring of five. James Keene of Woodstock cast the 1628 and 1629 bells. The tower had also an historic turret clock that may have been made early in the 17th century.

After the tower fire in 1918, John Taylor & Co of Loughborough recast the damaged bells as a ring of six in 1924 or 1925. The church has also an undated Sanctus bell.

The 1918 fire reduced the historic clock to "a twisted mass of old iron." In the late 1930s these remains were presented to the Museum of the History of Science, Oxford, where they were restored and installed as an exhibit. Donald Harden, Keeper of Antiquities at the Ashmolean Museum, recognised its similarity with the Dover Castle Clock, and in 1938 he concluded that the two were by the same clockmaker. It originally had a verge escapement like the Dover clock, but later in the 17th century the Combe clock was updated with a short pendulum.

John Smith and Sons of Derby supplied a new clock for the church in 1948.

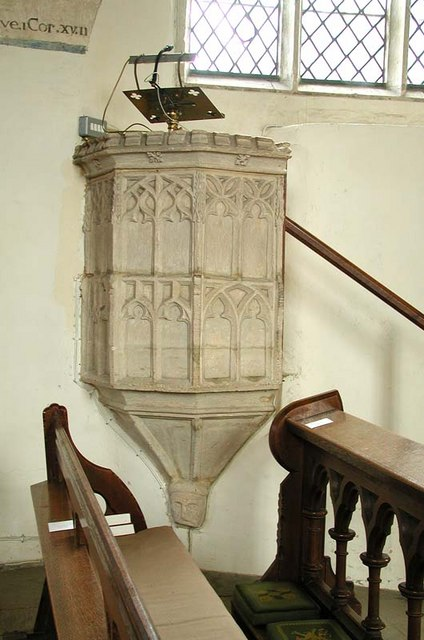
14th- or 15th-century Perpendicular Gothic pulpit

== Sources and further reading ==
- Beeson, C.F.C. (1989) [1962]. Simcock, A.V (ed.). Clockmaking in Oxfordshire 1400–1850 (3rd ed.). Oxford: Museum of the History of Science. pp. 35–36. ISBN 0-903364-06-9.
- Crossley, Alan; Elrington, C.R., eds. (1990). "Combe: Church". A History of the County of Oxford. Victoria County History. Vol. 12: Wootton Hundred (South) including Woodstock. London: Oxford University Press for the Institute of Historical Research. pp. 92–96. ISBN 978-0-19722-774-9.
- Emden, Cecil E. (1970) [1951]. Combe Church and Village. Oxford: Oxonian Press.
- Harden, D.B. (1938). "The Ancient Clock from Combe Church, Oxon" (PDF). Oxoniensia. III. Oxfordshire Architectural and Historical Society: 175.
- Long, E.T. (1972). "Medieval Wall Paintings in Oxfordshire Churches" (PDF). Oxoniensia. XXXVII. Oxfordshire Architectural and Historical Society: 86–90.
- Sherwood, Jennifer; Pevsner, Nikolaus (1974). Oxfordshire. The Buildings of England. Harmondsworth: Penguin Books. pp. 551–552. ISBN 0-14-071045-0.
