= Pickersgill =

Pickersgill is a surname, and may refer to:

- Barbara Pickersgill (born 1940), British botanist
- Edward Pickersgill (1850–1911), English politician
- Frank Pickersgill, (1915–1944) Canadian World War II hero
- Frederick Richard Pickersgill (1820–1900), English painter and illustrator
- Greg Pickersgill (born 1951), British science fiction fan
- Henry William Pickersgill (1782–1875), English portrait painter
- Jack Pickersgill (1905–1997), Canadian civil servant and politician; also J. W. Pickersgill
- John Cunliffe Pickersgill-Cunliffe (1819–1873), British member of Parliament
- Jeanette Pickersgill (?–1885), British poet, wife of Henry William Pickersgill
- Kenneth Pickersgill (born 1936), South African Army general
- Mary Young Pickersgill (born Mary Young, 1776–1857), American flagmaker
- Richard Pickersgill (1749–1779), British naval officer for whom the Pickersgill Islands were named
- Robert Pickersgill, Jamaican politician
- Robert Pickersgill Howgrave-Graham (1880–1959), British polymath
- Steve Pickersgill (born 1985), English rugby player
- William Pickersgill (1861–1928), English mechanical engineer
