= Gros Horloge =

14th-century astronomical clock in Rouen, France

Coordinates: 49°26′30″N 01°05′28″E

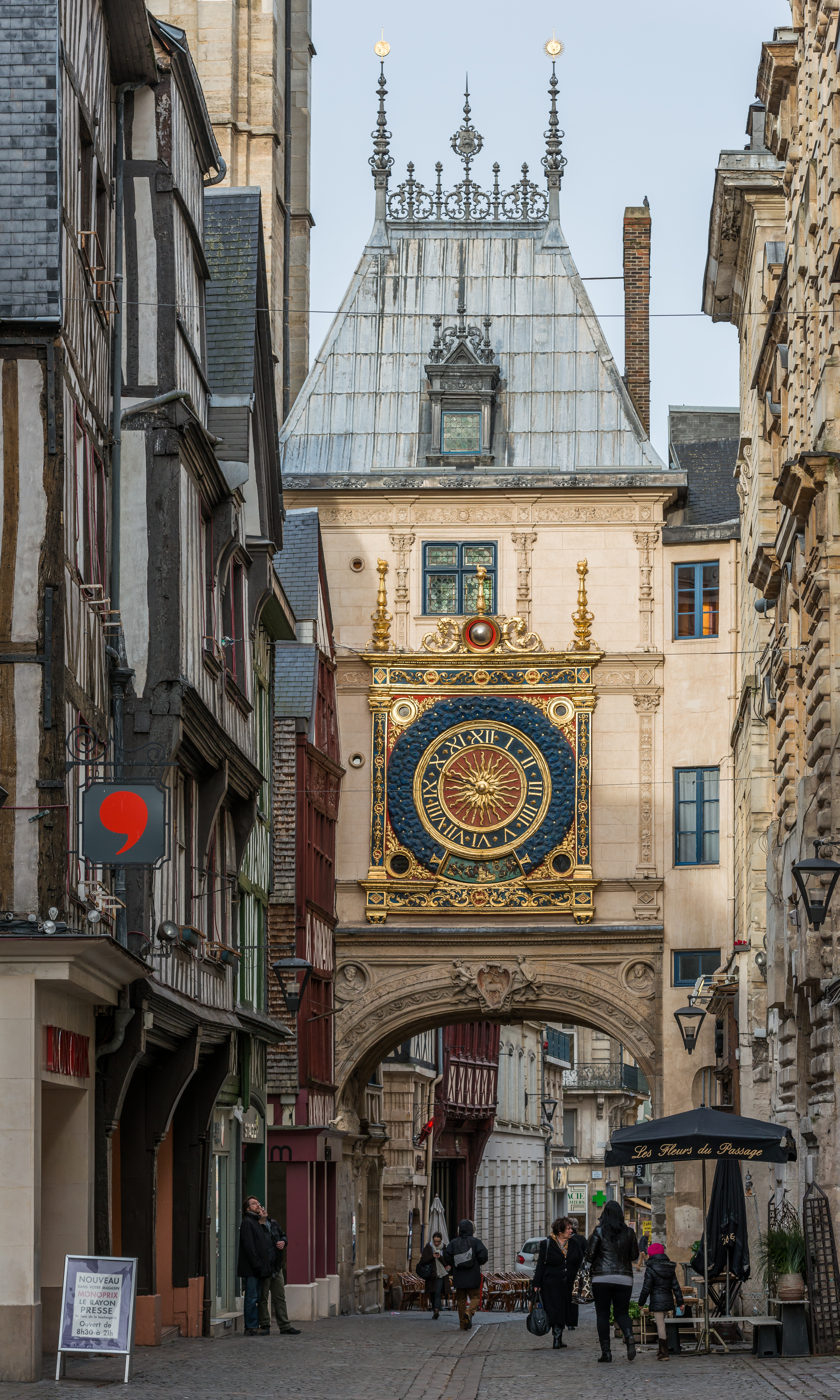

The Gros-Horloge (English: Great Clock) is an astronomical clock from the 14th century in Rouen, Normandy.

The clock is installed in a Renaissance arch crossing the Rue du Gros-Horloge. The mechanism is one of the oldest in France, the movement having been made in 1389. Construction of the clock was started by Jourdain del Leche who lacked the necessary expertise to finish the task, so the work was completed by Jean de Felain, who became the first to hold the position of governor of the clock.

The clock was originally constructed without a dial, with one revolution of the hour-hand representing twenty-four hours. The movement is cast in wrought iron, and at approximately twice the size of the Wells Cathedral clock, it is perhaps the largest such mechanism still extant. A facade was added in 1529 when the clock was moved to its current position. The mechanism was electrified in the 1920s and it was restored in 1997. As of 17 September 2025, the clock movement itself is fully functional. There is an electrical solenoid that rings one of the two bells in the tower on the 1/4 hr.

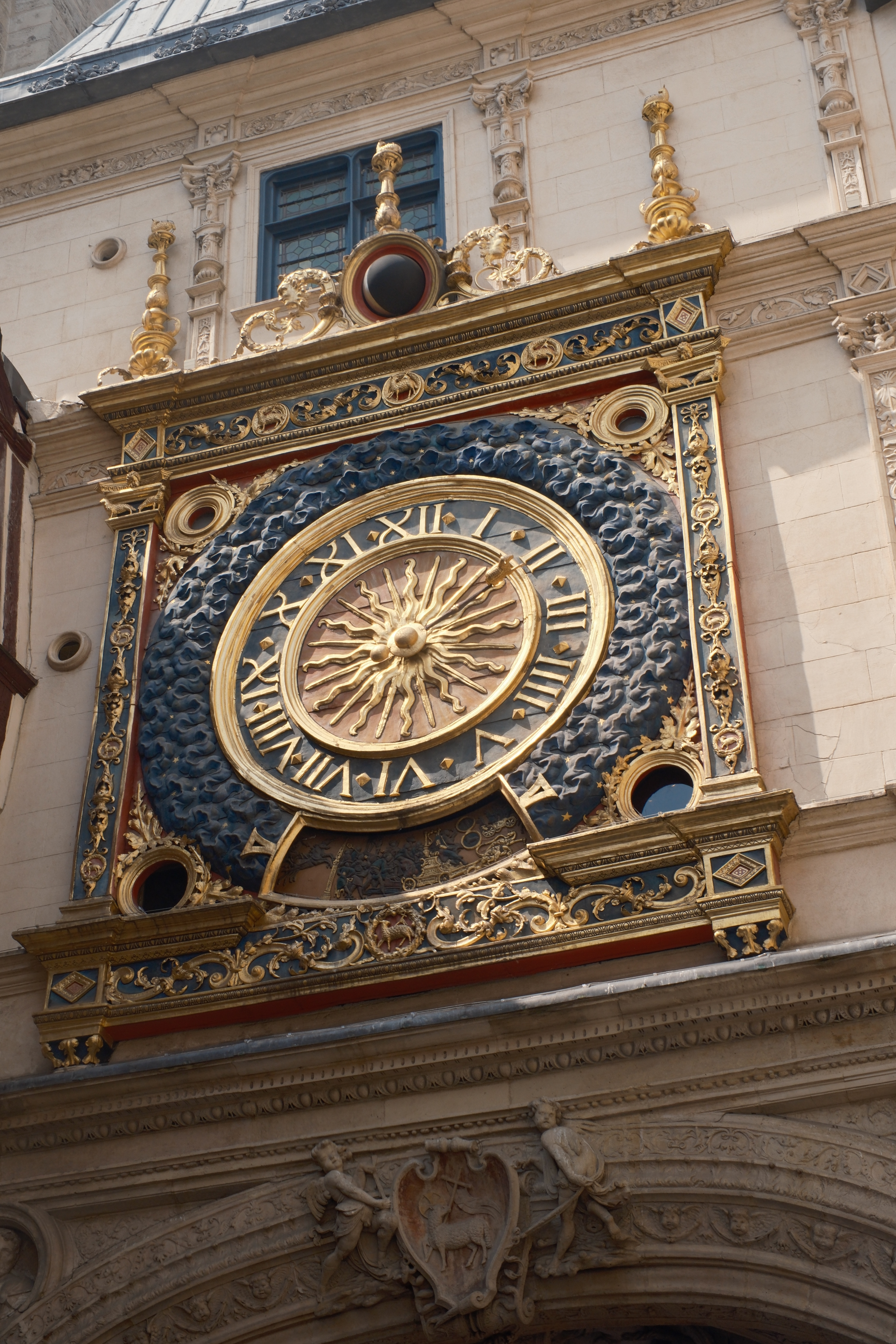
East facing clock of Le Gros Horloge in Rouen, France

The Renaissance facade represents a golden sun with 24 rays on a starry blue background. The dial measures 2.5 metres (25 dm; 250 cm) in diameter. The phases of the moon are shown in the oculus of the upper part of the dial. It completes a full rotation in 29 days. The days of the week are shown in an opening at the base of the dial, with allegorical subjects for each day.

The Gros Horloge has featured in paintings by J. M. W. Turner and the French impressionist Léon-Jules Lemaître.

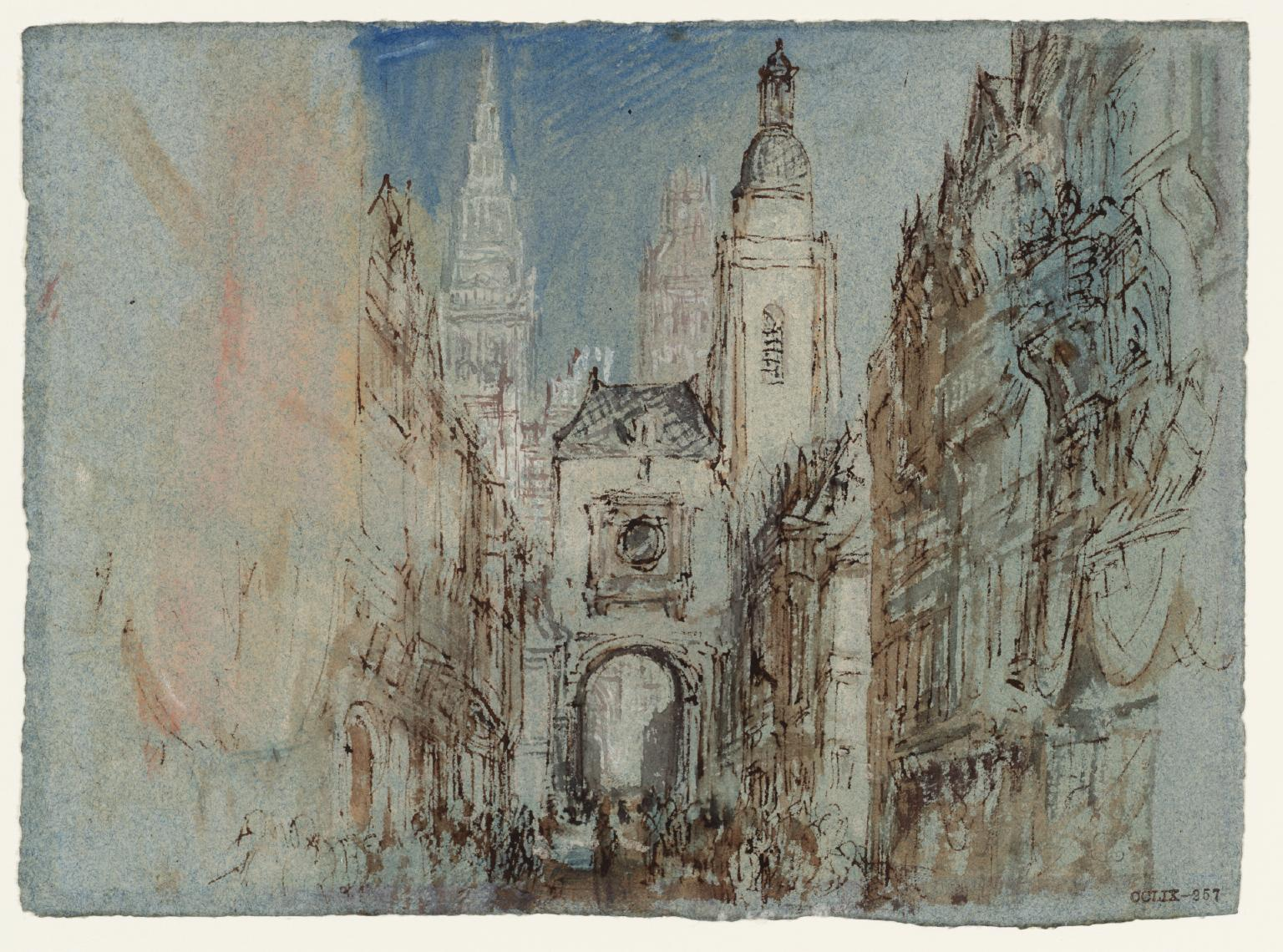
The Gros Horloge at Rouen, Normandy c.1832, by J. M. W. Turner
