= Cotehele clock =

Turret clock in Cornwall, England

Coordinates: 50.49592°N 4.225964°W

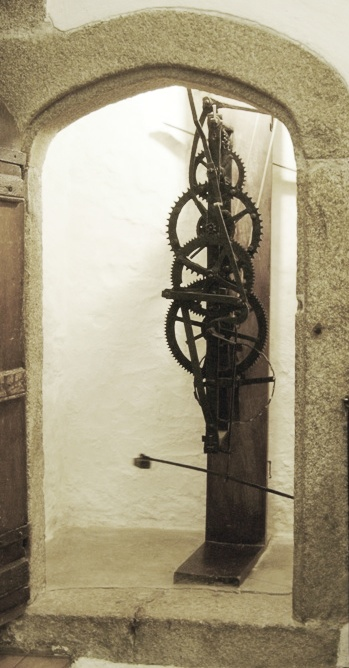
The Cotehele Clock

The Cotehele clock is situated at Cotehele House, Calstock, Cornwall. It is the earliest turret clock in the United Kingdom still working in an unaltered state and in its original position. It was probably installed between 1493 and 1521.

== History ==
The first chapel at Cotehele House dates from around 1411, but only parts of the north and south wall of the original building survive.

Piers Edgcumbe inherited Cotehele House in 1489. He married Joan Durnford in 1493 and she died in 1521. He remarried in 1525. Two important altarpieces commemorate the union of Edgcumbe and Durnford, so it is likely that the building work on the chapel was carried out during the early years of their marriage from 1493 onward. The alcove that houses the clock was added into the west wall of the chapel (the plan below has north on the right, so the west wall is at the top of the drawing). The 2004 building report states that the west wall was probably rebuilt during the work carried out on the chapel. It is thus likely that the clock was installed at the chapel between 1493 and 1521, with more probability towards the earlier date.

The clock is acknowledged to be the earliest turret clock in the United Kingdom still working in an unaltered state and in its original position. It has no face, but is attached to a bell which strikes the hour.

Unlike its contemporaries, the Cotehele clock was never converted to pendulum, which makes it one of the older original verge escapement and foliot clocks. Other clocks with this claim, such as the Salisbury Cathedral clock, were converted and later retrofitted with a verge & foliot.

As the construction dates of the Salisbury and the Wells Cathedral clocks are disputed (they are most likely early 16th century clocks), the Cotehele Clock may well be the oldest working turret clock in the UK. Even though large numbers of turret clocks were installed in the 14th century, none of them survived. The unique circumstances at Cotehele house assured that the clock was not replaced and scrapped.

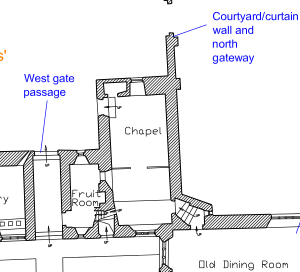
Cotehele House Chapel floor plan - the clock alcove is at the top left of the chapel, which is the west wall

This alcove appears to be purpose-built for the clock as it has a chimney-like chute that goes up to the bell and has just the right dimensions for the clock, the weights, and the double-pulley system. It is unlikely that a second-hand clock would have been procured for such a splendid new building. Also, the clock is in very similar style to those at Castle Combe and Marston Magna.

== 1962 Overhaul ==
The clock was taken apart and transported to Thwaites & Reed for restoration in 1962.

According to Cecil Clutton, the pinions were considered worn, but satisfactory, and they were left as found. Re-bushing was carried out in steel, and the clock was taken back to Cotehele and re-assembled.

The strike release mechanism was replaced during this overhaul, as the lever in place is stamped T&R and dated. Also, the wooden frame to which the clock is fixed seems to have been renewed.

The verge suspension also appears to be of newer date and looks similar in style to the new strike mechanism. It is possible that the verge was originally suspended from a string.

== 2002 Overhaul ==
A conservation project was undertaken to return the clock and bells to working order in time for the Golden Jubilee of Elizabeth II in June 2002.

Peter Watkinson, turret clock maker and antique clock restorer, overhauled the clock. He dismantled and thoroughly cleaned its components, then applied grease and reassembled. If the weights are adjusted correctly, the clock tells accurate time to within a couple of minutes per day. The clock runs on two weights – one connects to the striking train and the other to the going train. Currently, the clock is started in the morning before opening time and stopped in the afternoon after closing time. Theoretically, the clock could run 24 hours on a full wind.

== Mechanism ==
The striking train sits on top of the clock, the going train is below.

=== Frame ===
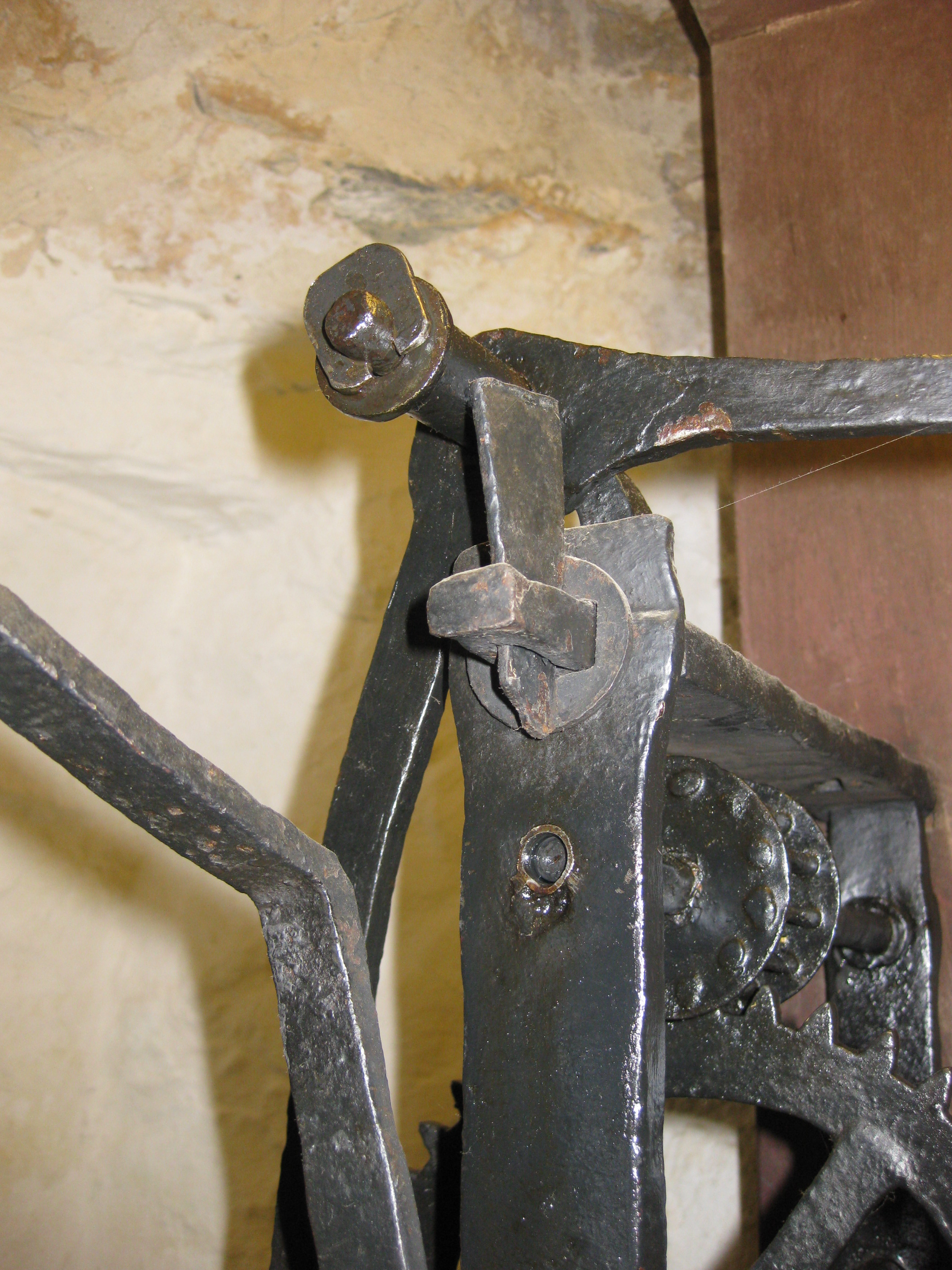
The top of the frame with the bell lever

The frame is a two-post door frame made from wrought iron. The top and bottom horizontal bars are fixed to the vertical bars by wedged tenon.

The total frame height is 115 cm, and the iron bars which form the frame are approximately 4 cm wide and 1.5 cm thick.

=== Going Train ===
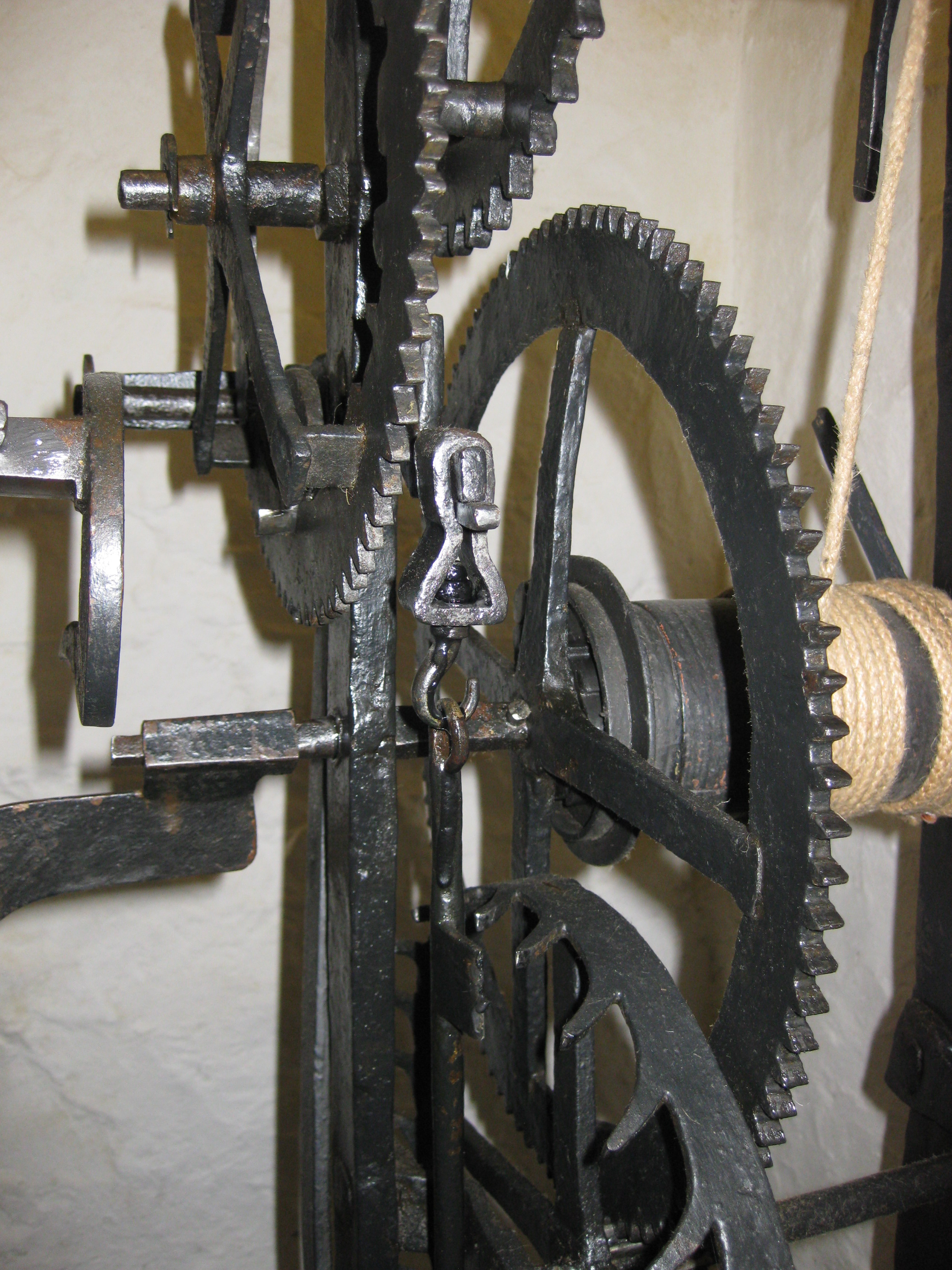
The going train. The verge suspension is in the middle of the photo, the escapement wheel at the bottom, and the great wheel to the right. Also visible is the barrel with the rope wound around it.

The gear ratios are as follows:

- the great wheel has 95 teeth, the escapement wheel has an 8-tooth pinion, making this an 11.875:1 gear ratio. The escapement wheel has 25 teeth.

The great wheel of the going train does one turn in 3600 seconds (1 hour), the escapement wheel takes 303.1579 seconds for one turn, and the foliot does one full swing in 12.1263 seconds, one half swing in 6.06317 seconds.

The foliot is 89 cm wide, with a grooved section of roughly 9 cm on either side. The left foliot side has 13 teeth, the right has 10 teeth to adjust the weights. The length of the verge is 56 cm. The lower verge pallet is 3.7 cm high, the upper pallet is 3 cm high. Both are approximately 2 cm wide. The pallets are at a 110° angle.

The escapement wheel has an outer diameter of 28 cm, and a width of 4 cm including the teeth. It has 4 spokes, each roughly 2 cm wide and 7mm thick.

The going train is wound with a capstan with 4 spokes. Theoretically, the rope could be wound 24 times around the barrel without having to layer it, thus enabling the clock to run for a full day and night without winding. The winding mechanism has a ratchet for the barrel.

It is interesting that if the great wheel had 96 teeth instead of 95, the gear ratio would have been a lot more logical and would have resulted in exactly 12 seconds for a double swing. This points again to a manufacturing date in the late 15th century, as minutes and seconds were not used in clock making and only the concept of an hour was known.

Also, the very short section of the foliot that allows weight adjustment makes it clear that this clock was never used for unequal hours (12 hours from sunrise to sunset, making hours shorter in winter and longer in summer), but was always used to measure equal hours and probably run 24 hours per day. The shortness of the grooved outer sections would not allow the clock to strike 12 times within 8 hours in winter or 12 times within 16 hours in summer.

=== Striking Train ===
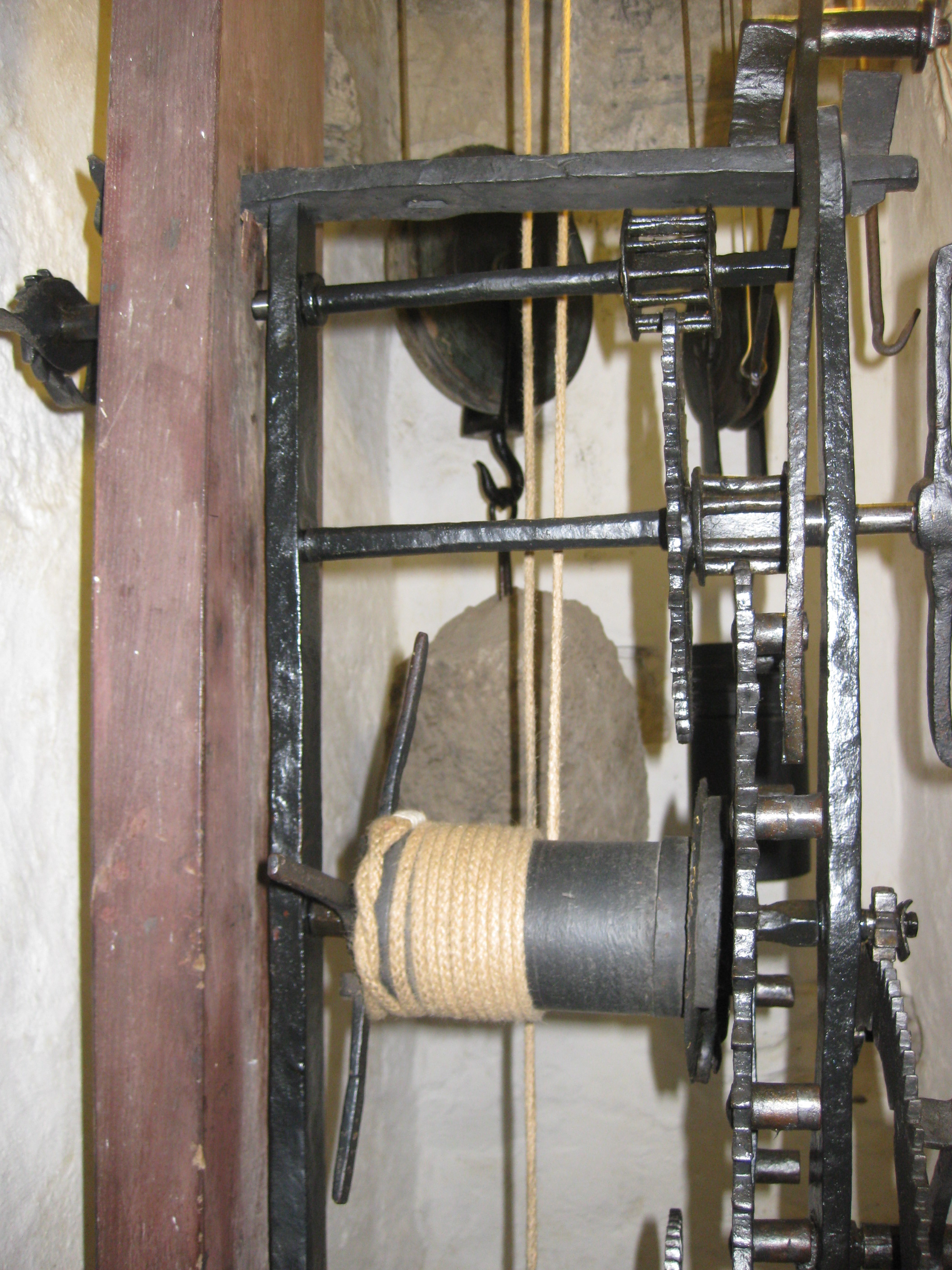
The striking train from the side. Fly arbor at the top, then the flail arbor, and the great wheel and winding barrel at the bottom. Half of the count wheel is visible on the bottom right.

The great wheel of the striking train has 78 teeth and 8 pins that operate the bell lever. The gearing for the count wheel is:

- 8 teeth pinion to 78 teeth | ratio 9.75:1

This corresponds to the 78 strikes the clock has to make in 12 hours

The gearing for the fly is as follows:

- great wheel to flail arbor: 48 teeth to 8 pins | ratio 6:1
- flail to fly arbor: 40 teeth flail to 12 pins fly arbor | ratio 3.333:1

The count wheel turns once in 12 hours, the big wheel turns 9.75 times in 12 hours, thus striking the bell 78 times in 12 hours, and the flail arbor turns once every strike of the bell, and the fly turns 3.333 times per strike of the bell.

The count wheel has 78 teeth on the outside, and the 12 notches are on the inside of the count wheel. The main arbor has an 8 teeth pinion which drives the count wheel. This directly reflects the ratio of strikes to lifting pins on the main wheel, as each turn of the count wheel has to produce 78 strikes ( 1 + 2 + 3 + 4 + 5 + 6 + 7 + 8 + 9 + 10 + 11 + 12 = 78). One turn of the count wheel = 9.75 turns of the big wheel.

The barrel of the striking train can take the necessary 19.5 windings of rope to produce the 156 strikes necessary to run a full 24 hours.

=== Weights ===
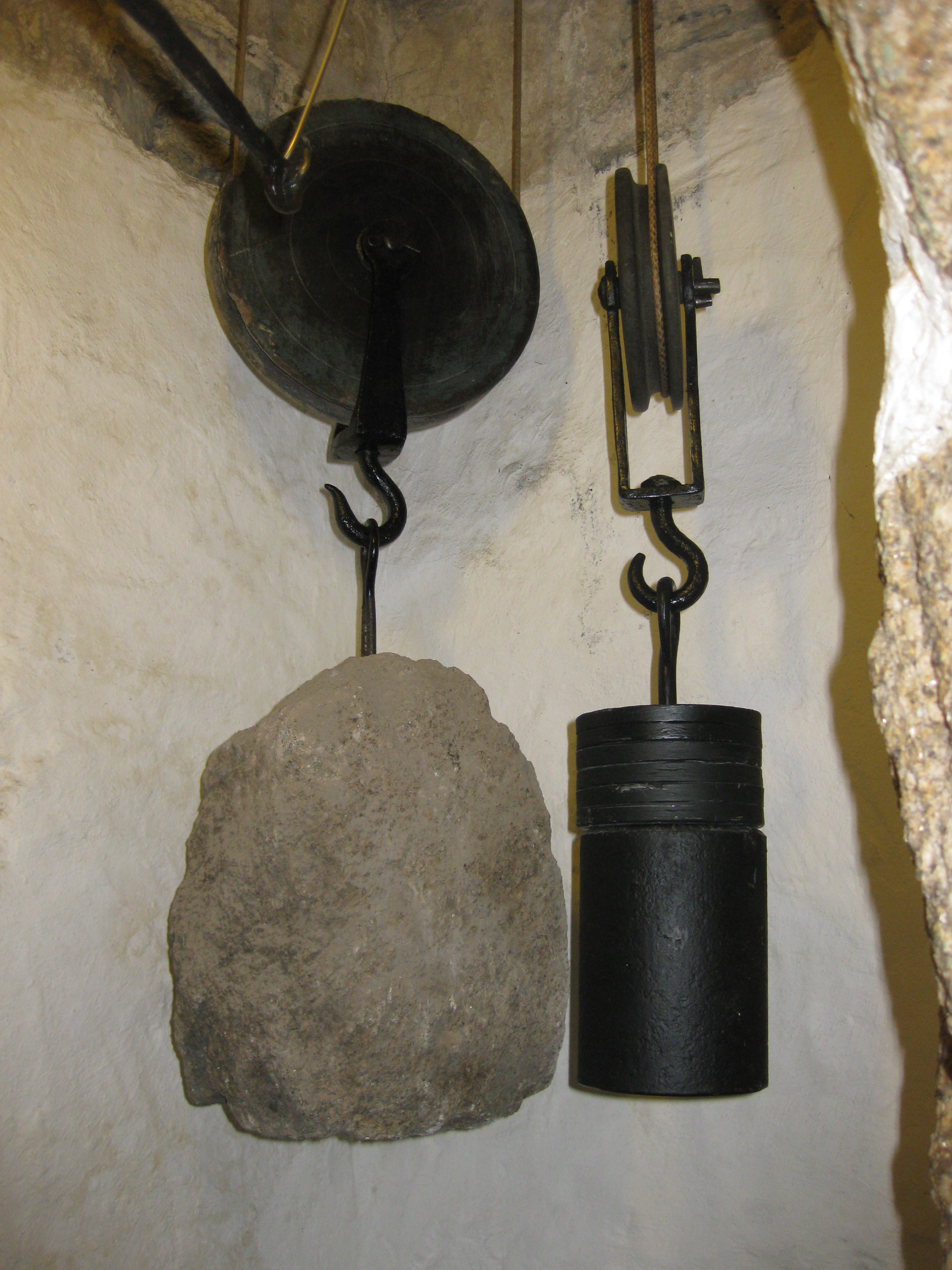
The clock weights. The going train weight on the left, striking train weight on the right.

The going train has a stone weight, and the striking train an iron weight. The striking train weight roughly weighs 40 kg, the going train stone weight is slightly heavier. As the weights use a double-pulley system, they descend by half the rope given by the clock, and exercise a force of half their weight on the clock.

== Accuracy ==
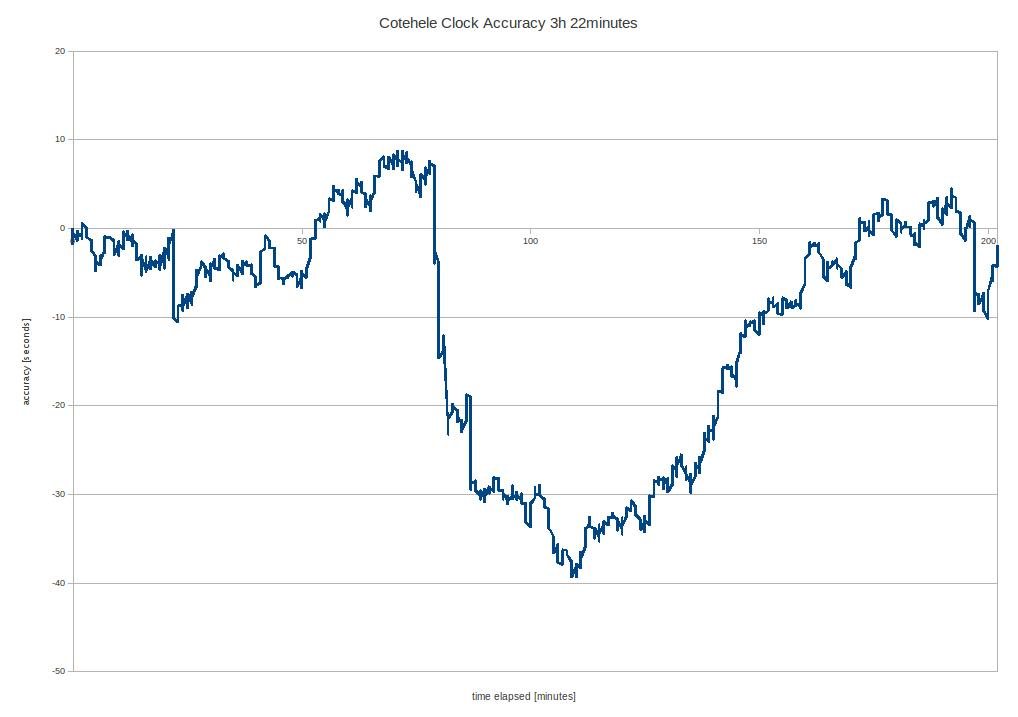
Cotehele clock Accuracy

The accuracy of the clock was measured on 5 May 2011 for a period of 3 hours and 22 minutes. The clock's accuracy varied from +10 to -40 seconds, but it is very hard to make any predictions on the day-to-day accuracy of the clock.

There is no pattern that is repeated every 60 minutes, but this might well have to do with the fact that the gear ratio of the going train is 95:8, meaning that it takes a full 8 hours until the same teeth on the escapement wheel pinion and the great wheel engage again. A longer measuring interval (24 hours) might be necessary to observe repeat patterns.

There are a couple of factors that influence the accuracy of the Cotehele Clock:

- the verge suspension is not original and has a lot of friction. A string-suspended verge would reduce friction greatly and make the clock run more evenly
- the foliot swings at an angle and not exactly horizontally
- the escapement wheel and the pallets of the verge do not engage very exactly. This leads to the verge pallets "falling" onto the escapement teeth causing a lot of vibration in the verge and foliot. This could be down to wear over the years, and to a reconstruction of the pallets at an earlier overhaul
- the weight of the reconstructed strike release mechanism. The strike release was probably replaced in 1962, and weighs a lot more than the original strike release would have weighed due to material thickness. Making the strike release from a thinner profile (e.g. around 4 to 5mm like the rest of the movable clock parts) would put less pressure on the going train during the preparation period for strike release.

Considering that sundial time varies +- 15 minutes throughout the year, the Cotehele clock was a perfect instrument for measuring time in the 15th and 16th century. If run 24 hours a day (the strike can be turned off at night), it only needed adjusting every couple of days at noon with the help of a sundial whenever the sun was out. Even if the sun wasn't visible for a longer stretch of days, the clock would still keep good enough time if it was wound fully once per day.
