= Wells Cathedral clock =

Clock

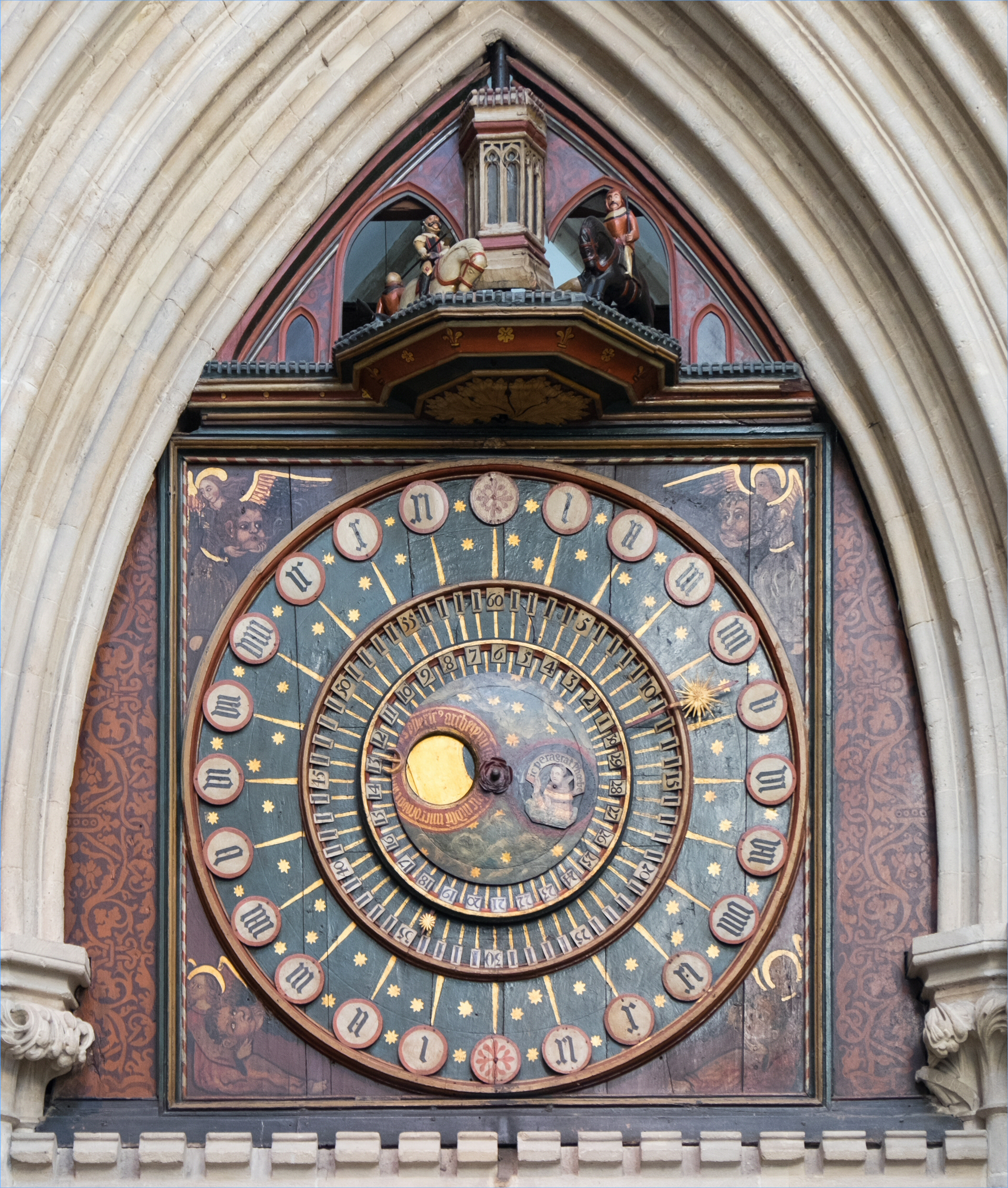
The clock inside Wells Cathedral. The yellow disc by the centre represents the moon. The sun is much smaller, and rotates in the outermost disc.

The Wells Cathedral clock is an astronomical clock in the north transept of Wells Cathedral, England. The clock is one of the group of famous 14th– to 16th–century astronomical clocks to be found in the West of England. The surviving mechanism, dated to between 1386 and 1392, was replaced in the 19th century, and was eventually moved to the Science Museum in London, where it continues to operate. The dial represents the geocentric view of the universe, with the Sun and Moon revolving round a central fixed Earth. It may be unique in showing a philosophical model of the pre-Copernican universe.

Another more basic dial is mounted on the outside wall, driven from the same mechanism. This was first installed in the 14th or 15th centuries, but has been restored a number of times.

== Description ==
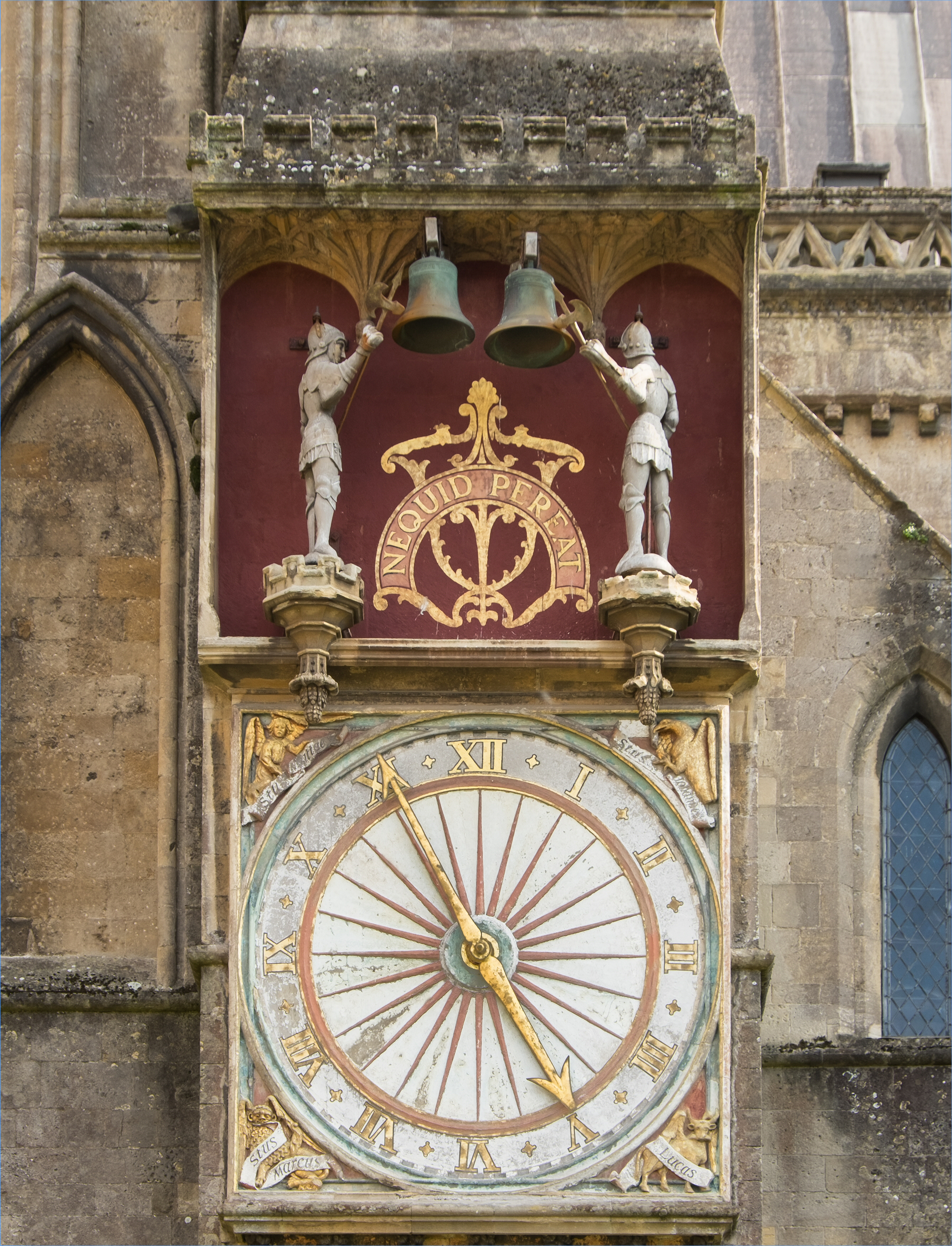
The exterior dial is much more basic. The Latin “Nequid Pereat” means “Let nothing perish”.

=== Interior Dial ===
The interior dial of the clock proposes a geocentric model of the universe (above right). The earth is at the centre. A background of the stars, the sun, and the moon revolve around it. In the corners, four angels hold the four cardinal winds. These may be generating the power that makes the universe operate.

The Sun (the large gilded star on the outer ring) rotates once every 24 hours, indicating the hour against the Roman numerals I to XII and I to XII around the outside of the dial. Noon is at the top of the dial, reflecting the position of the Sun in the sky at this time.

The minutes are indicated by a smaller star on the ring inside.

The Sun indicating the hour is attached to a disc (the "moon back plate") numbered 1 to 30 around the edge, for the days of the lunar month. The moon back plate rotates once every 24 hours, and its centre has a black and gold surface. In front of it, a disc (the "moon plate") rotates slightly slower (completing a cycle in approximately 24 hours 49 minutes), so that the displacement between the moon plate and the moon back plate completes a cycle in a lunar month. The moon plate contains a large circular window that reveals the black and gold of the moon back plate to show the moon phase. A three-pronged pointer on the outer edge of the circular window points to the lunar day on the edge of the lunar back plate.

Around the moon phase window is inscribed sphericus archetypum globus hic monstrat microcosmum ("globus" is hidden underneath the petalled central cap of the dial), which translates as This spherical globe here shows the archetypal microcosm. Howgrave-Graham notes that microcosmum might be a scribal error for macrocosmum, the more obvious word, although the inscription in the Cosmati pavement in Westminster Abbey includes the same phrase, possibly with microcosmum or macrocosmum (records differ, and the inscription is now illegible). Opposite the Moon circle is a weighted pivoted disc, containing a small painting of Phoebe, representing the Moon. The inscription reads: Sic peragrat Phobe, or So progresses Phoebe.

At the centre of the dial, the ball represents the Earth, and the clouds suggest the same.

Above the clock and to the right is a figure, known as Jack Blandifers, or Blandiver, who hits a bell with a hammer held in his right hand and two bells hung beneath him with his heels. A set of jousting knights also chase each other every 15 minutes.

=== Exterior Dial ===
Located on the cathedral's north transept, the exterior dial is a conventional 12-hour clockface with Roman numerals. Every 15 minutes, two knights above the clock face strike the bells to mark the quarter hour. The hour bell is at the top of the central tower.

== History ==
There are mentions of a clock at Wells during the first half of the 14th century, with a payment being made for the keeper of the clock in 1392–1393.

In 1388, Bishop Ralph Erghum moved from Salisbury to Wells. He had previously been Bishop of Salisbury, from 1375 to 1388, and had installed a clock there in 1386. He may have brought his clockmakers with him to Wells. The two clocks are almost identical in construction, although the Wells clock shows some improvements and additions, which suggests that some valuable lessons had been learned. The Wells striking system uses a double lever, for example, which is more reliable than the system used in Salisbury. It can be safely assumed that the Wells clock and the Salisbury clock are roughly of the same age, as they share a lot of construction details. The assumption that both clocks were made in the 14th century is not verifiable, as only a payment to a keeper of a clock is mentioned, but no detail about the clock itself at the time is known.

However, John Leland the antiquary claimed in the mid 16th century that the clock at Glastonbury Abbey, just six miles from Wells, was made by Peter Lightfoot, a monk at the Abbey, and further evidence is provided by the monastic chronicler, John of Glaston. Glaston says it was "a great clock distinguished by shows and figures in motion". It was reported (in 1828) that "At the Reformation, this clock was removed from Glastonbury Abbey to its present situation in Wells Cathedral". Lightfoot was also reputed to have made the clocks at Wimborne and Exeter. However, a re-consideration of all the facts leads to the conclusion that following the construction of the Glastonbury Abbey clock, Lightfoot was engaged to make a clock especially for Wells Cathedral.

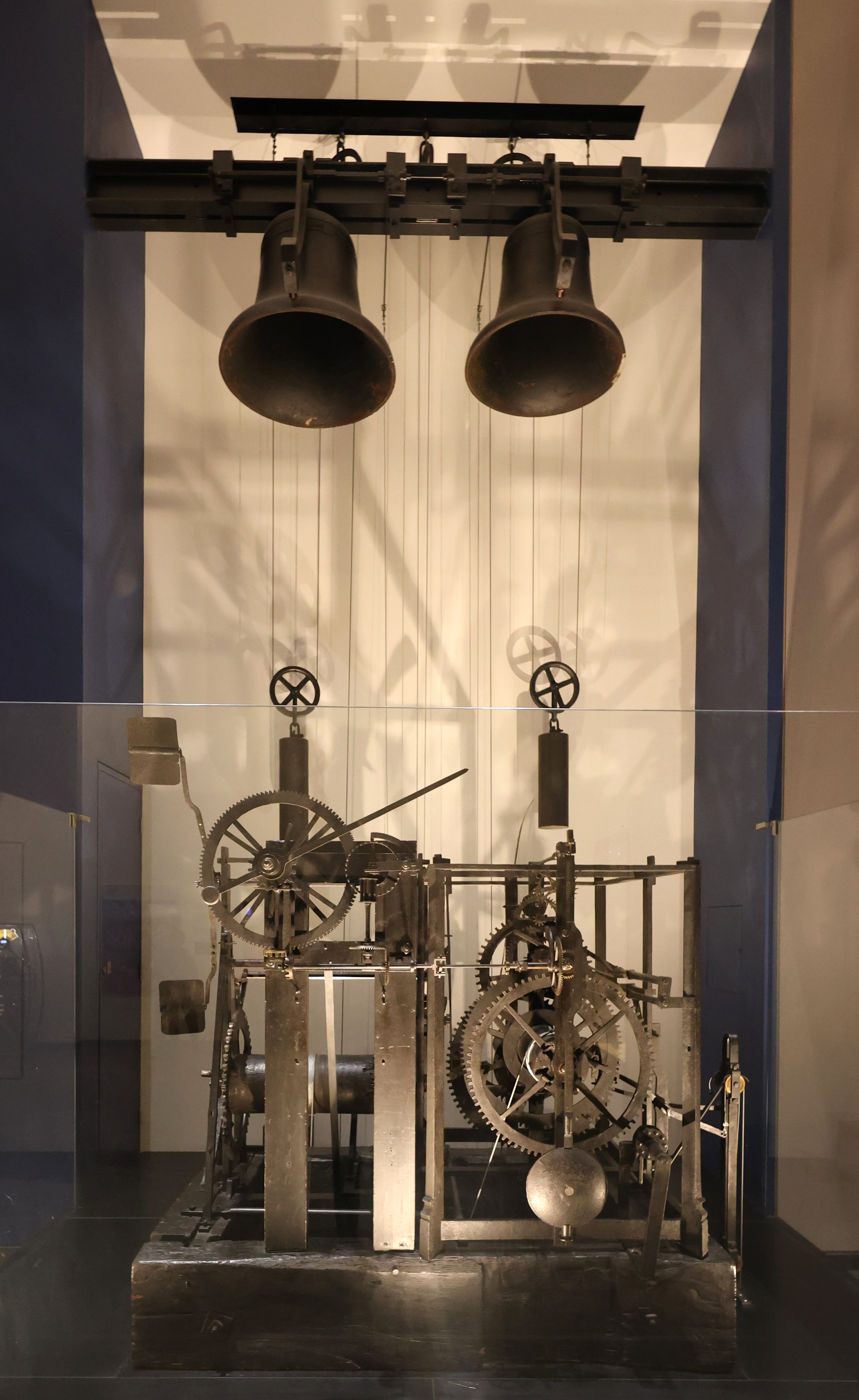
The original mechanism in the science museum

The clock was converted to pendulum and anchor escapement in the 17th century. The original mechanism was installed in the Science Museum in London in 1884.

In August 2010, the current Keeper of the Great Clock of Wells, Paul Fisher, announced his retirement. With the Cathedral authorities planning to fit an electric motor to wind the clock, his retirement was set to end the practice of winding the clock by hand.

== See also ==
- Salisbury Cathedral clock
- Exeter Cathedral Astronomical Clock
- Ottery St Mary Astronomical Clock
- Wimborne Minster Astronomical Clock
- Castle Combe Clock
- Cotehele clock
