= Dover Castle Clock =

17th century turret clock

Dover Castle Clock is a turret clock from the beginning of the 17th century. It used to be in Dover Castle, and is now an exhibit in the Science Museum, London.

== History and description ==
The origin of the clock is uncertain, but it is thought to date from about 1600. It was discovered in Dover Castle in 1851 and removed from there in 1872. It was restored and exhibited working in the Scientific Exhibition of 1876.

The Dover is one of the few surviving clocks from this era that still has its original foliot, a primitive balance wheel which was the timekeeper used in the earliest clocks, consisting of a bar with weights hanging from the ends, which rotates back and forth. Most medieval clocks had their foliots replaced by pendulums after 1657 when the pendulum was invented. In the 19th century this misled scholars into thinking the clock may have been made as early as 1348. In the 20th century the date of the clock was revised to about 1600.

== Comparison with Combe clock ==
The clock is similar to one in the History of Science Museum, Oxford that came from St Laurence's parish church in Combe, Oxfordshire. In 1938 Donald Harden, then Keeper of Antiquities at the Ashmolean Museum, reported "They are identical in design, workmanship and method of construction, even down to the peculiar and rather puzzling cranking of the arm for carrying the lever that lifted the hammer". The only difference he found was that the Dover clock is slightly smaller. Harden therefore concluded that the same clockmaker made both clocks.

== Sources ==
- Harden, D.B. (1938). "The Ancient Clock from Combe Church, Oxon" (PDF). Oxoniensia. III. Oxfordshire Architectural and Historical Society: 175.
- Timbs, John (1868). Wonderful Inventions: From the Mariner's Compass to the Electric Telegraph Cable. London: George Routledge & Sons.
