= St Andrew's Church, Castle Combe =

Coordinates: 51°29′36.34″N 2°13′46.45″W

St Andrew's Church
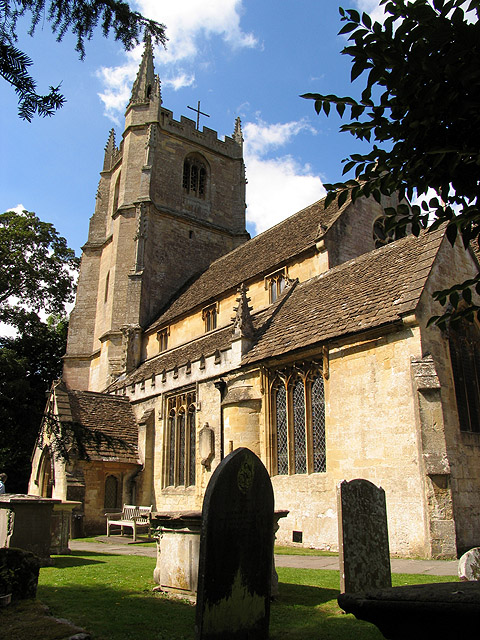
- South side of church

- Location within Wiltshire
- OS grid reference: ST 84152 77189
- Location: Castle Combe, Wiltshire
- Country: England
- Denomination: Anglican

History
- Status: Parish church

Architecture
- Functional status: Active
- Heritage designation: Grade I
- Designated: 20 December 1960
- Completed: 13th and 15th centuries, restored 19th century

Specifications
- Materials: Rubble stone and ashlar, stone tile roof

Administration
- Province: Canterbury
- Diocese: Bristol
- Deanery: Chippenham
- Parish: Castle Combe

St Andrew's is a parish church in Castle Combe, Wiltshire, England, built in the 13th century with additions in later centuries. It was restored due to structural concerns in the 19th century. It is a Grade I listed building.

== Building ==
The structure of the church mostly originates from the 15th century, but includes some extant 13th century work in the chancel and 14th century work in the chapel. The building is composed mainly of rubble stone and ashlar, with a stone tile roof. There is a tower on the west side of the building on which construction begun in 1434. The tower has many features of a late medieval church including pinnacles, diagonal buttresses and battlements. The interior of the church consists of a nave, chapels to the north-east and south-east, aisles and a south porch.

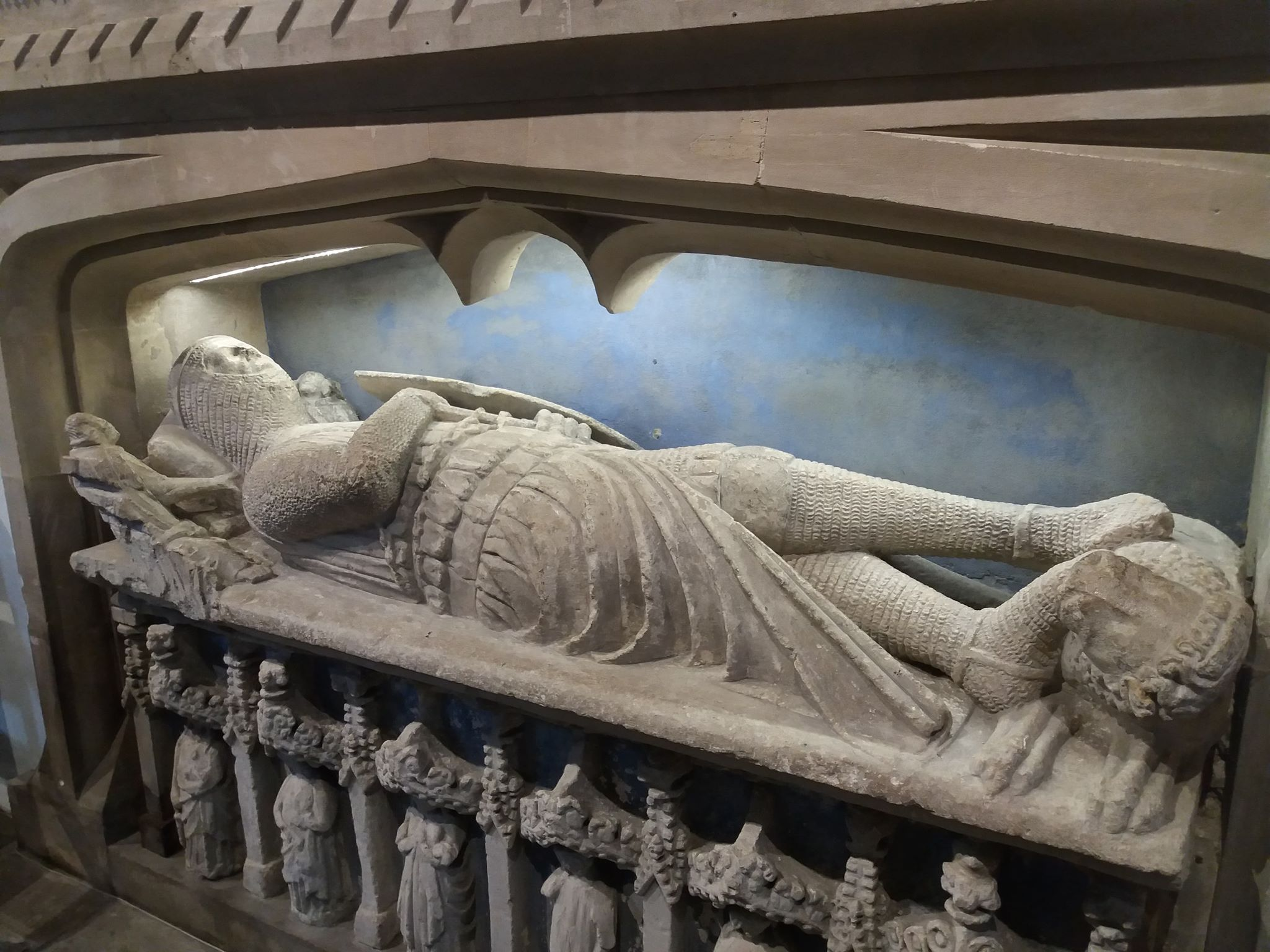
C. 13th century memorial dedicated to Sir Walter de Dunstanville

The Lady Chapel was the Scrope family chapel as of the mid 15th century. In the early 19th century the structure became unstable and the building was restored, funded chiefly by a member of the Scrope family. There was further restoration to the roof in 1962. Many of the adornments, such as the 19th century chancel fittings bear the Scrope family coat of arms. There is a 19th-century canopied Gothic Scrope family monument in the Lady Chapel.

Within the Lady Chapel there is a late Norman memorial dedicated to a Baron of Castle Combe, Walter de Dunstanville (d. 1270). The effigy is cross legged and an accompanying sign indicates that this is because Dunstanville served in the crusades.. However, the idea that cross-legged effigies indicate a crusader has been discredited by modern scholarship.

In recent years there have been a number of restoration projects for the church, with work being completed to the roof and medieval screen in 2016 and 2018 respectively.

The organ was donated in 1911 and renovated in 1988. There is an operational medieval faceless clock at the base of the tower.

== Churchyard ==
There are a number of tombs, memorials and monuments in the churchyard, 25 of which are Grade II listed.

== Status ==
The church is in the area of the Bybrook Team Ministry and is actively used for worship.

== See also ==
- List of Grade I listed buildings in Wiltshire
