= Salisbury Cathedral clock =

Ancient clock of Salisbury Cathedral

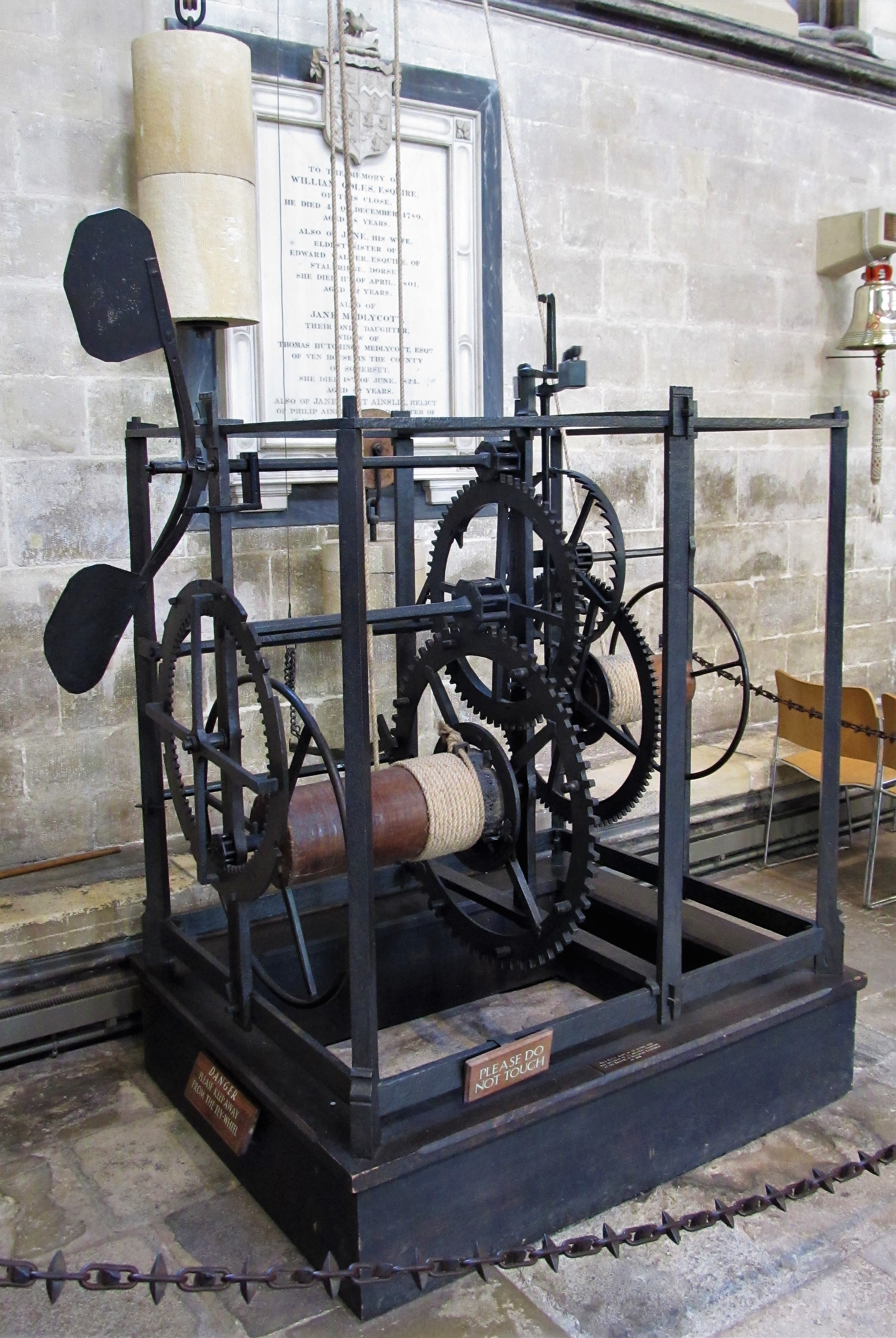
Salisbury Cathedral clock, restored

The Salisbury Cathedral clock is a large iron-framed tower clock without a dial, in Salisbury Cathedral, England. Thought to date from about 1386, it is a well-preserved example of the earliest type of mechanical clock, called verge and foliot clocks, and is said to be the oldest working clock in the world, although similar claims are made for other clocks. Previously in a bell-tower which was demolished in 1790, the clock was restored to working condition in 1956 and is on display in the North nave aisle of the cathedral, close to the West front.

== History ==
The clock was re-discovered in 1928, set aside in the cathedral tower. At that time it had a pendulum, which appeared to have been installed at a later date, replacing a verge and foliot. The clock was restored in 1956, and a reproduction verge and foliot were installed. There were no drawings or documents available, and it is possible that the original foliot and verge escapement did not look exactly like the one now installed in the clock.

The striking train of the clock is believed to be original.

Like many of these more practical devices, its main purpose was to strike a bell at precise times. It probably did not have a dial. The wheels and gears are mounted in a four-post wrought iron frame. The framework is held together with metal wedged tenons, rather than with nuts and bolts (which had not been invented).

As found, the escapement was a pendulum which must have been a replacement, as clocks of this age would have had a verge and foliot. The power was supplied by two large stone weights. As the weights descend, ropes unwind from the wooden barrels. One barrel drives the going train which is regulated by the escapement; the other drives the striking train, the speed of which is regulated by the fly (air brake).

Before the weights reach the floor, they have to be wound back up again, a task that explains the presence of two large wheels shaped like steering wheels at either end of the clock.

The clock is now a "single strike" clock that strikes only on the hour. It makes one strike per hour of the day (e.g. one strike at noon). The left half of the clock (as in the photograph above), is the striking train; the right half is the going train. When it was built, it may have simply struck bells for the Masses (daily religious services), of which there were up to four.

At the end of the 17th century, the Salisbury clock, like many others, was modified from verge and foliot to pendulum and anchor operation. This usually made clocks much more accurate, even though trials in the early 1990s by Michael Maltin showed that the clock was running to within two minutes a day if the rope on the barrel was kept in a single layer. As soon as there are two layers, more torque is applied to the barrel by the weight and the clock goes faster. As a single layer of winding is enough to keep the clock going for 12 hours, it could have been kept exact to within two minutes per day if it had been wound twice per day.

In 1790, the old bell tower 'on the ditch of the close of the canons of the said church' mentioned in the deed of 1386 which had housed the clock was demolished, so the clock was moved to the Cathedral's central tower. In 1884, a new clock was installed and the old one was left to the side.

== "Oldest working clock" claim ==
Others claimed to be the world's oldest working clock are in the cathedral of Beauvais in France (said to date from 1305, and entirely preserved, in its architectured frame), the clock tower of Chioggia in Italy, and the clock of the Comayagua Cathedral, in Honduras. (Said to be built in Spain by the Moors during the 12th century, although records of it are lost). The oldest clock in the world with a proofed engraved date (1463) is the Backhaus Clock in Forchtenberg, Germany.

The clock is one of a group of 14th to 16th century clocks to be found in the West of England at Wells, Exeter, Castle Combe, Ottery St Mary, and Wimborne Minster. An attempt to date this clock to around 1386 was made by T.R. Robinson. His estimated date has been supported by others.

Mechanical clocks began to flourish in Europe in the 14th century. Other clocks from that century, such as those at Rouen (Gros Horloge), Paris (Heinrich von Wick clock) or Dijon (the clock taken by Philip the Bold from Courtrai in 1382), have either been lost, destroyed, or substantially modified. The Wells Cathedral clock might have been made by the same craftsmen as the Salisbury clock, but is usually dated to around 1392, and is now in the Science Museum in London, where it continues to operate.

There are some doubts that the clock displayed in Salisbury Cathedral is actually the clock mentioned in 1386, as the construction is quite advanced and more comparable to clocks made in the 16th and 17th century than those made in the 14th century. The question if this is the 1386 clock is quite important as the Wells Cathedral clock was previously dated in the 16th century, but then dated 1392 after the discovery of the Salisbury clock in 1928. Dating mistakes for old turret clocks are not uncommon. The Dover Castle clock was initially dated in the 14th century, only to be later revised to around 1600.

In 1993, Christopher McKay organised a symposium with the Antiquarian Horological Society to determine if the clock could be dated to 1386. The majority of participants voted for it to be the original, but roughly 1/3 of participants voted the clock to be of a much later date.

Research published in 2018 by Keith Scobie-Youngs compares the three tower clocks of similar patterns – in Salisbury, Wells and Rye (St Mary the Virgin) – and considers them to be from the same maker; he concludes from minor stylistic differences that the clock in Rye is the oldest of the three.

== Revival ==
The clock was re-discovered in the tower in 1928 by T.R. Robinson, an horological enthusiast who went up the clock tower to see the new clock (installed in 1884). The presence of the old clock was known to many, but nobody attributed much importance to it. It was only T.R. Robinson who believed that it was the clock mentioned in 1386. From photos taken in 1928, it looked to be fairly complete. Eventually its historic importance was realised. It was first put on display in the Cathedral's North transept. Then, in 1956, the clock was restored towards its presumed original condition and started working again. The pendulum and recoil escapement were replaced by a new verge and foliot escapement, thus restoring the clock to something like its original design.

Today, the escapement operates, but the striking mechanism is normally prevented from running by a clamp, which may be removed for demonstration purposes.

== 1956 restoration ==
Messrs. John Smith & Sons of Derby received the clock in February 1956. It was taken apart for the transport. They reassembled the clock in their workshop and compared it to existing clocks in the Science Museum before deciding how to restore it.

The help of Rolls-Royce was enlisted to have X-ray photographs of two of the wheel arbors taken. This confirmed that the two arbors of the going train had been lengthened when the clock had been converted to pendulum operation. Subsequent investigations revealed that the clock had actually been converted twice, as remains of an earlier pendulum escapement were discovered.

The clock is now displayed in the North nave aisle of the cathedral, close to the West front.

Train	Part	Previous work	1956 Restoration
going train	great wheel	disc with two pins attached to great wheel as it only turned once every two hours due to conversion to pendulum	after removing the disc, the original hole for the pin was discovered and a new pin was fitted
going train	escape wheel	replaced with anchor escape wheel	new escape wheel forged, teeth marked out by hand, riveted onto existing second wheel
going train	winding barrel		new wooden winding barrel fitted
going train	foliot support bracket		new foliot support bracket forged and fitted
going train	foliot		new foliot forged and fitted
striking train	hoop wheel	flange of hoop wheel reversed	flange of hoop wheel replaced correctly
going train	turning direction, strike release	strike release moved to front of frame, rotation of going train reversed to clock-wise to fit clock dial (1613)	strike release moved to back of frame, rotation of going train reversed to anti clock-wise as it was originally

== Technical details ==
=== Frame ===
The frame height is 1.24m, the width 1.29m, and the depth 1.06m.

=== Going train ===
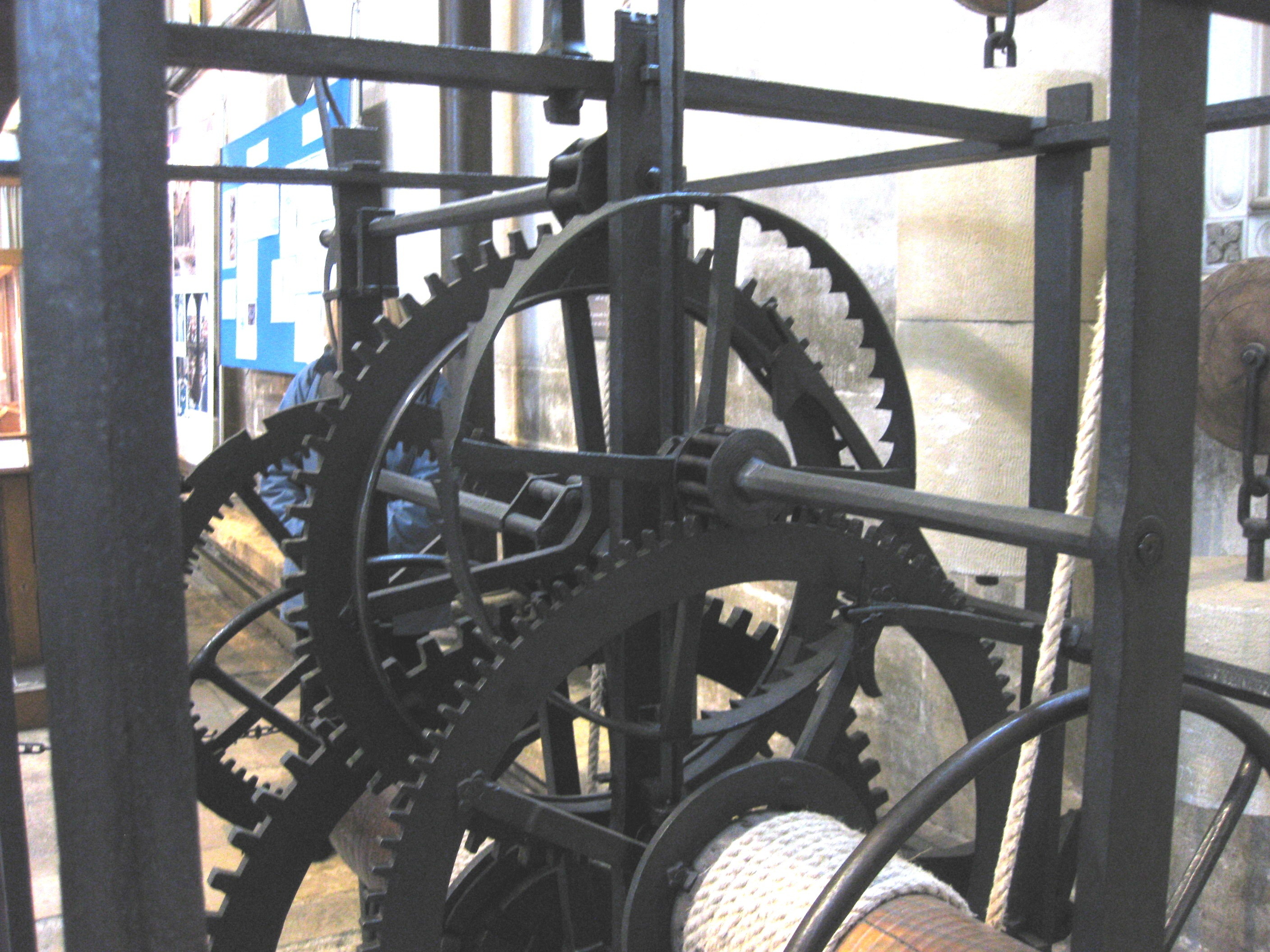
The going train of the clock

Great wheel to verge escape wheel: 100 to 10, verge escape wheel 45 teeth.

The Great wheel turns once in 3600 seconds (1 hour), so the verge escape wheel turns once in 360 seconds. One full foliot swing thus takes 8 seconds, or 4 seconds per half swing.

Seen from the going train side, the great wheel with the winding barrel turns anti-clockwise, and the escapement wheel turns clockwise.

=== Striking train ===
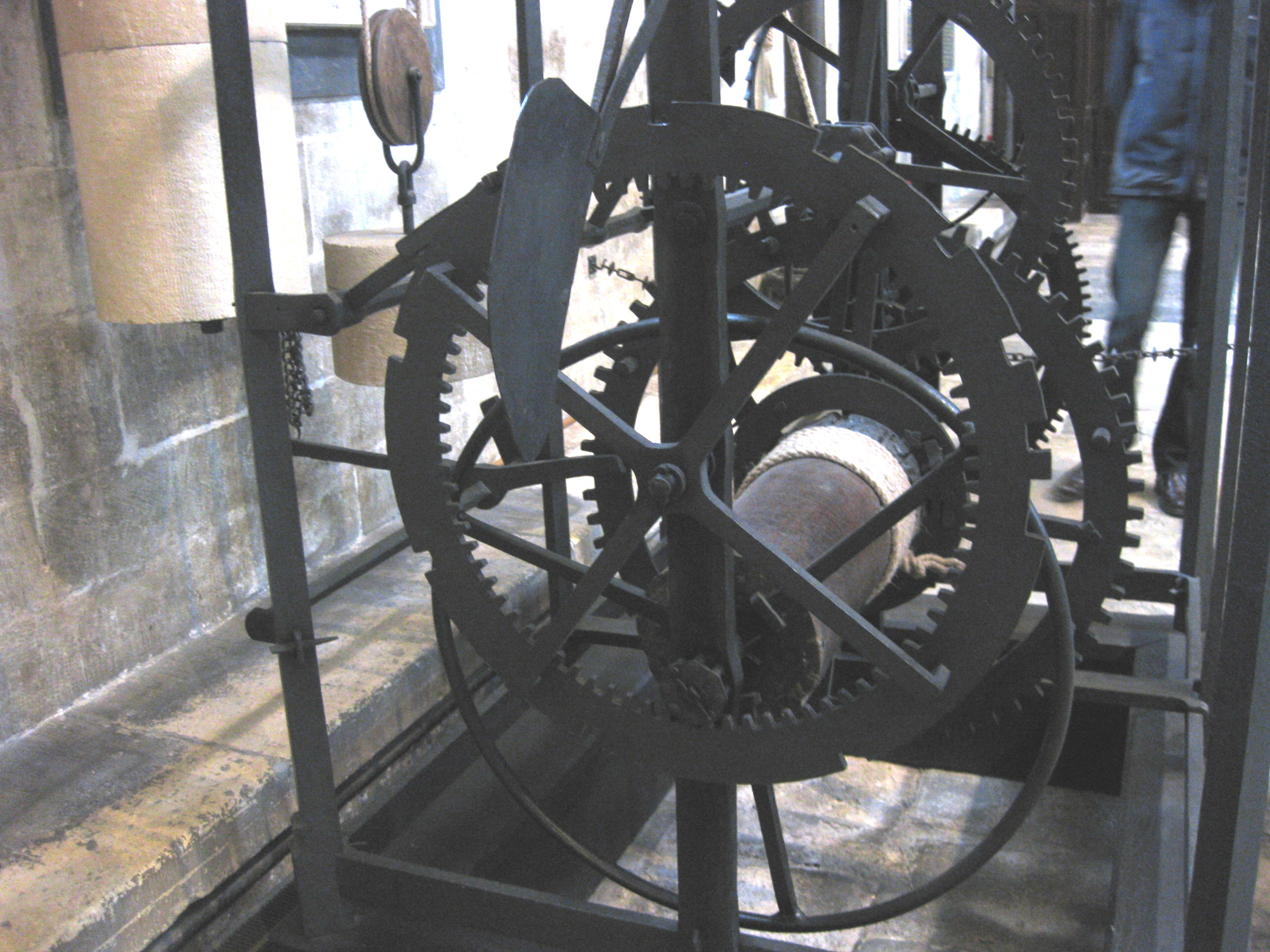
The striking train of the clock

Great wheel to fly: 64 teeth driving an 8 pin birdcage; second (hoop) wheel 64 teeth driving an 8 leaf pinion on the fly. So each turn of the great wheel makes the fly turn 64 times, or 8 turns of the fly per strike of the clock (as the great wheel has 8 striking pins).

Great wheel to count wheel: 8 tooth pinion to internal 78 teeth on count wheel, with 8 striking pins on the great wheel. This directly corresponds with the 78 strikes the clock will make in 12 hours (1 + 2 + 3 + 4 + 5 + 6 + 7 + 8 + 9 + 10 + 11 + 12 = 78). The count wheel turns once every 12 hours, so the great wheel turns 9.75 times, operating the strike lever thus 9.75 × 8 = 78 times.

Seen from the striking train side, the great wheel with the winding barrel turns clockwise, the hoop wheel anti-clockwise, the count wheel clockwise, and the fly clockwise.

The count wheel only appears to have 11 notches, but the clock strikes 12 times each complete turn. This is because the first strike (when the clock strikes one) is executed whilst the lever is still within the first, wider, notch. The locking piece is lifted out of the hoop of the hoop wheel, which then turns once, which leads to the great wheel turning 1/8 and striking once. Then the locking piece falls back into the hoop wheel. The fly will continue to turn until it stops gently on his own as it has a ratchet mechanism, which protects the bird cage on the fly arbor.
