= Rue du Gros-Horloge =

Street in Rouen, France

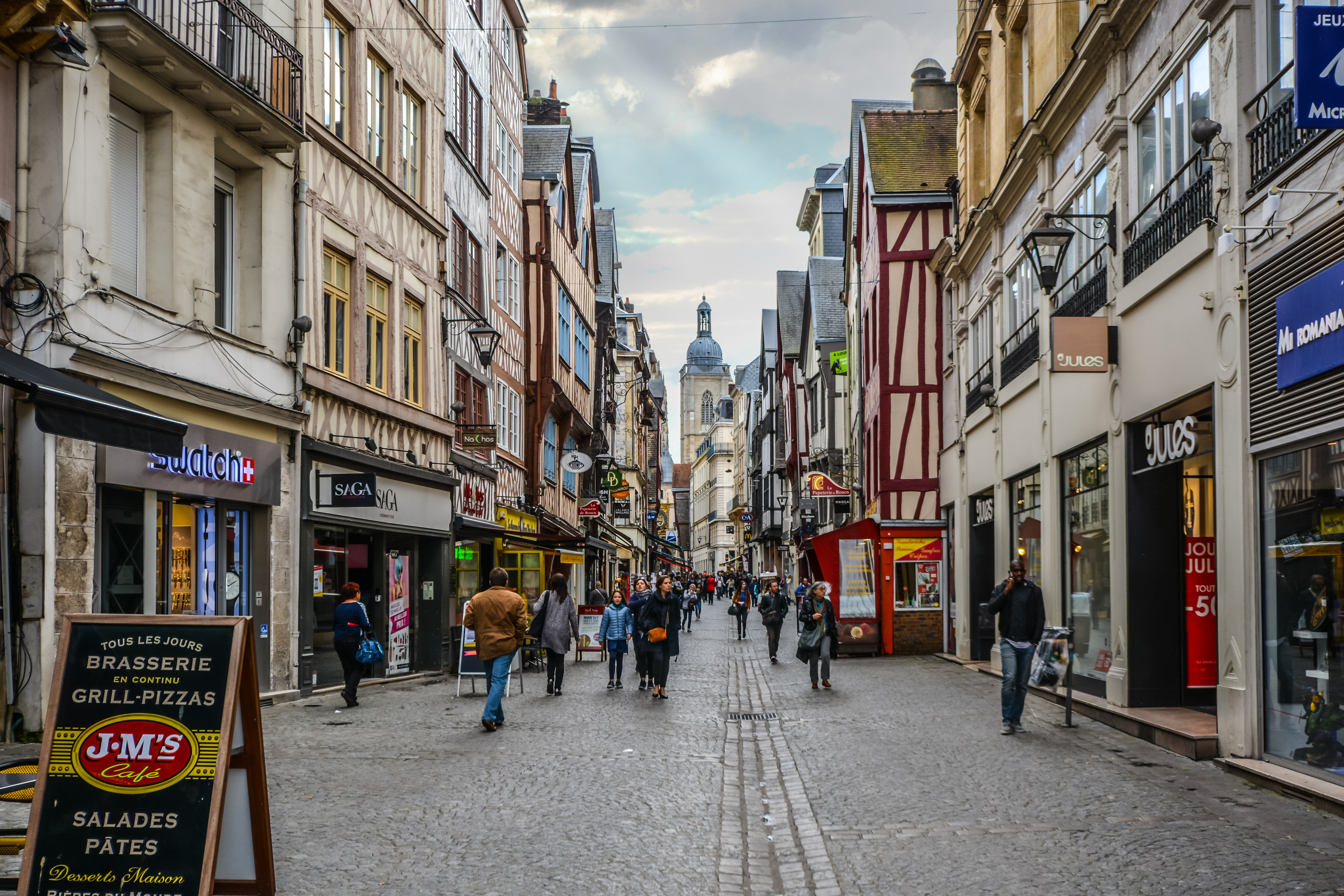
- View of the street

- Location within France
- Coordinates: 49°26′31.322″N 1°05′4.061″E
- From: Place de la Cathédrale
- To: Place du Vieux-Marché

The Rue du Gros-Horloge is the main public pedestrian thoroughfare in the French city of Rouen.

== Origin of the name ==
It takes its name from the Gros Horloge, one of the emblematic monuments of the city.

== Historical ==
It is possible that the street is located on the axis corresponding to the decumanus of the Gallo-Roman city of Rotomagus, the former name of Rouen.

In 1527, the street was spanned by a stone arch, which then led to the old town hall.

It bore the names of "Grande-Rue", "rue Courvoiserie", "rue Courvoyserie", "rue Massacre", "rue Vanterie", "rue Wanterie" before reverting to the name "Grande-Rue" during the Revolution before taking its current name.

In 1932, the first Monoprix store in France opened there, under the name Noma, a contraction of “nouveau magasin” (new store).

In 1971, the street became the first pedestrian street in France.

== Bibliography ==
- Eustache de la Quérière, Description historique des maisons de Rouen, Paris, Firmin Didot, 1821
- Arnaud Perinelle and Véronique de Haas, Rouen : Le Gros-Horloge, Condé-sur-Noireau, Charles Corlet, 1982, 32 p. (ISBN 2-85480-033-8, OCLC 461979910)
