= Castle Combe Clock =

Clock in St. Andrew's Church, England

Coordinates: 51.4934°N 2.2298°W

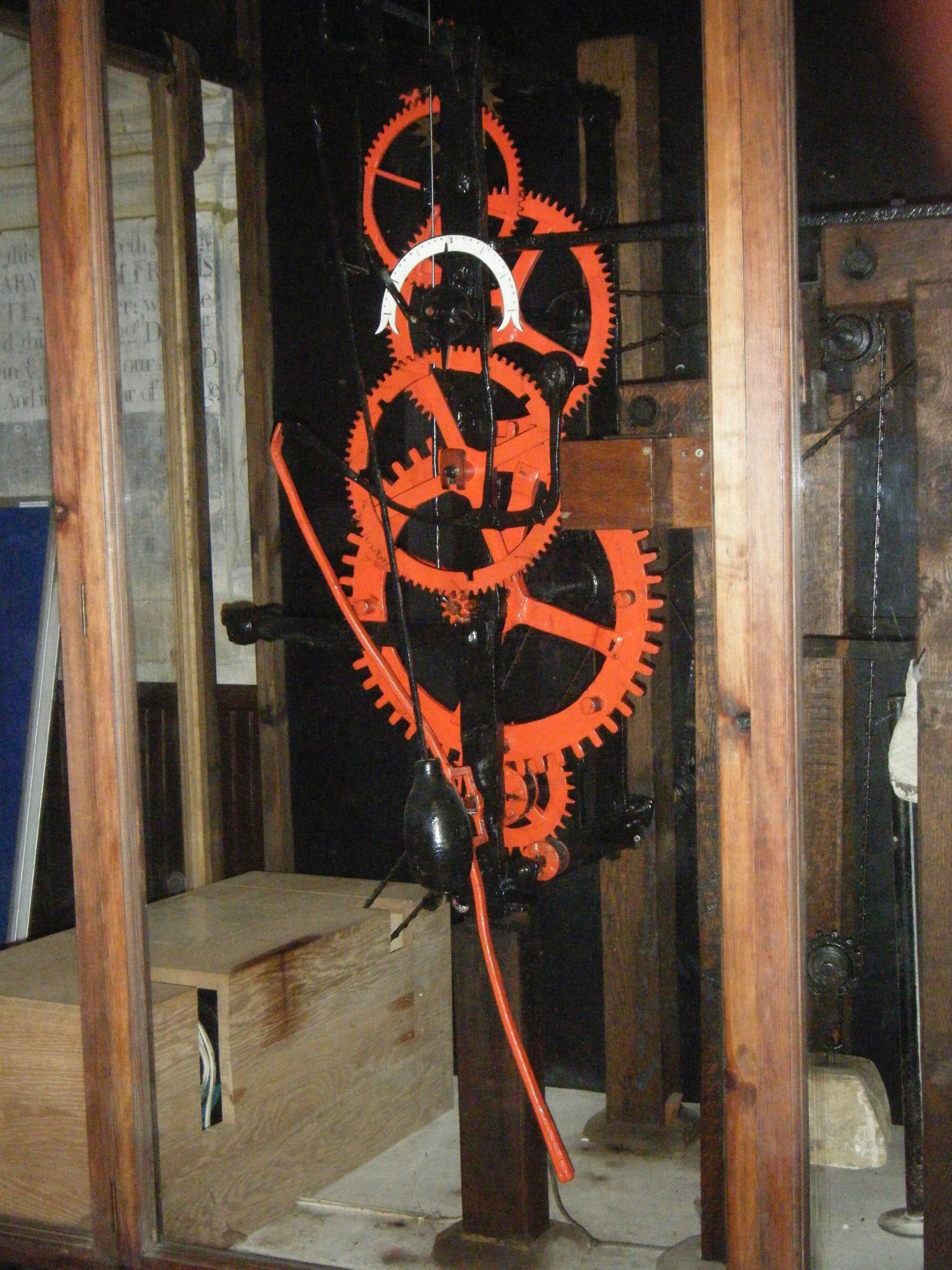
The Castle Combe clock

The Castle Combe clock in St. Andrew's Church, Castle Combe, Wiltshire, England was probably made in the late 15th century. It is faceless and strikes a bell in the church tower.

== History ==
There are no known documents that show an exact date when the clock was manufactured, but it is of similar construction to the Exeter Cathedral clock, the Marston Magna clock in Somerset and the Cotehele clock in Cornwall. A comparison with those clocks makes it likely that it was constructed in the late 15th century.

Sometime after 1670, the clock was converted from verge escapement and foliot to a pendulum. For the conversion, the clock was turned upside-down and the release mechanism for the hour strike was adapted to the new positioning of the clock.

In 1984, the clock was taken down from the bell tower to the nave of the church, and put on a concrete plinth in a wooden cabinet with glass panes. The moving parts were painted a lurid bright orange, and a minute hand with a 180 degree dial was added. The manual winding spokes were removed and electric winders were installed for both the going and striking train.

== Mechanism ==
The going train sits on top of the clock and the striking train is below. This used to be the other way around, before the clock was converted to have a pendulum.

=== Frame ===
The two-post door frame is made from wrought iron. The top and bottom horizontal bars are fixed to the vertical bars by wedged tenon. The frame bars are approximately 1 centimetre (0.39 in) thick and 3 centimetres (1.2 in) wide.

=== Going train ===
An anchor escapement was fitted to the clock; the date of this conversion is unknown.

The escapement arbor turns anti-clockwise. The pendulum theoretically swings once every second, and the escapement wheel (brass) has 20 teeth, so the escapement arbor takes 40 seconds per turn.

On the second arbor, the gears consist of an 8-pin birdcage and a 64-teeth wheel, which thus takes 320 seconds per turn. This arbor is probably not original and might date from the conversion to pendulum. This arbor is held by two short brackets that centre approximately 3 centimetres (1.2 in) to the left of the main frame. The brackets are roughly riveted to the main frame.

An 8-pin birdcage engages with 90 teeth on the main wheel, thus taking 3,600 seconds (one hour) per turn.

It is likely that the minute hand and dial were fitted after 1971, as they do not appear in Beeson's photo of the clock. The big wheel of the going train is probably the only geared wheel that is original, as it is of the same construction as the wheels of the striking train.

=== Striking train ===
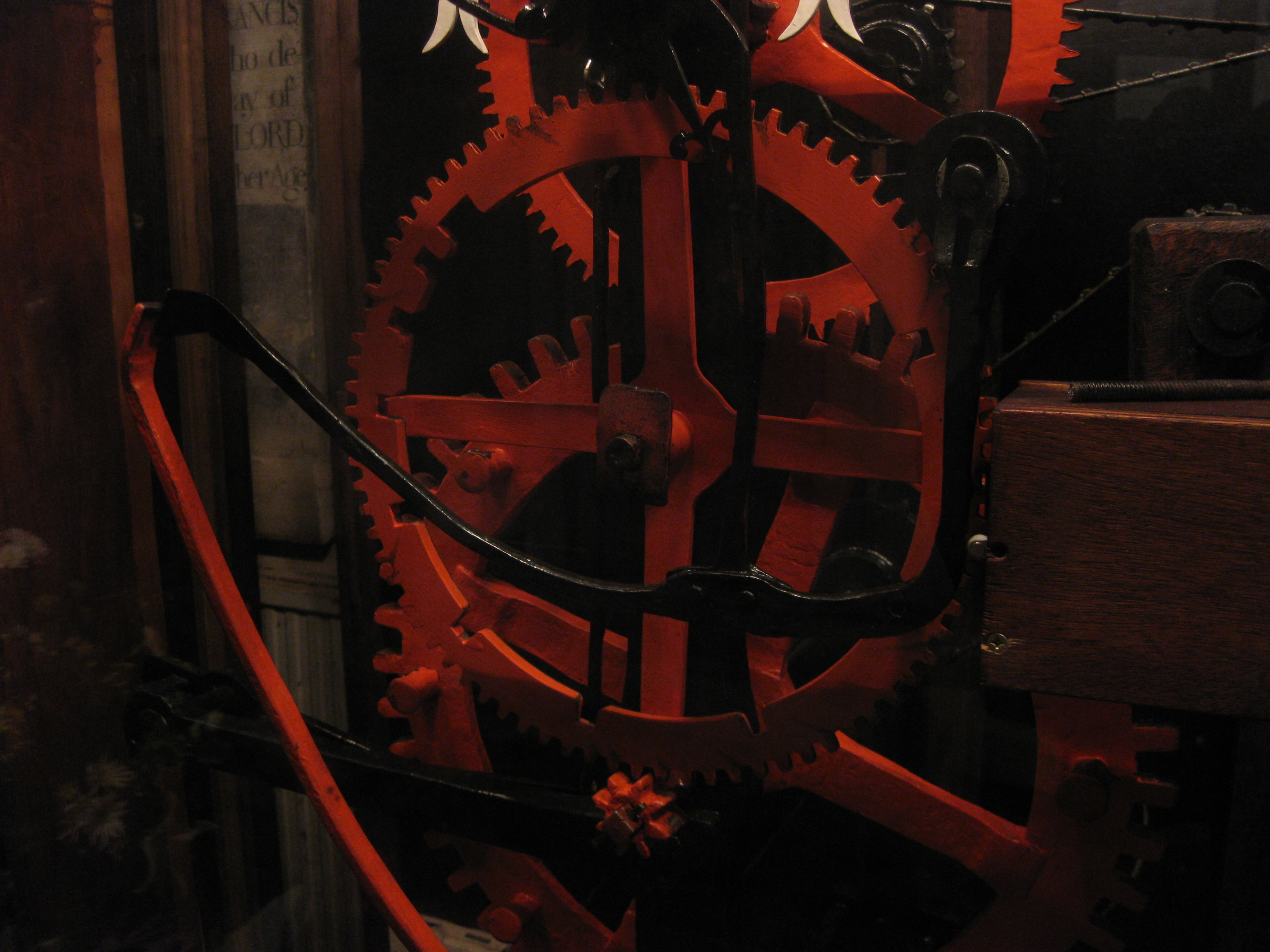
Count wheel and locking mechanism

The big wheel of the striking train has 48 teeth, which are of rectangular cut with a rounded-off head.

An arbor below the big wheel has an 8-pin birdcage and a 24-teeth wheel, making a x6 gear ratio. This arbor has on the outside of the clock frame a balanced metal rod fixed to it which is used for the clock and release of the striking train. The top end of this rod is slightly longer and flattened, whereas the bottom end of the rod is shorter and wider to compensate the weight.

Below this second arbor, there is the fly arbor which is connected via an 8-pin birdcage, making a x3 gear ratio. Each turn of the main wheel will turn the fly 18 times. As the main wheel has 8 hour pins, each single hour strike corresponds to 2¼ turns of the fly, which is located at the back of the clock outside the clock frame.

Above the big wheel, the count wheel is mounted on the front of the clock outside the clock frame. The count wheel has 78 teeth on the outside, and the 12 notches are on the inside of the count wheel. The main arbor has an 8-tooth pinion which drives the count wheel. This directly reflects the ratio of strikes to lifting pins on the main wheel, as each turn of the count wheel has to produce 78 strikes (the total of numbers 1 through 12). One turn of the count wheel is equal to 9¾ turns of the big wheel.

The big wheel of the striking train turns anti-clockwise, the second arbor with the lock/release rod turns clockwise, and the fly turns anti-clockwise.

It appears that most of the wheels of the striking train are original. The count wheel might have been replaced at a later stage, as its construction and execution is different from the other wheels. It is possible that an earlier count wheel only rang the bell once every hour, as this was not unusual for clocks with similar design.

=== Lock and release mechanism for the striking train ===
As the clock was turned upside-down when converted to pendulum, the locking mechanism had to be redesigned so that gravity could provide the force for locking the striking train again.

A pivot bracket to the top right of the count wheel holds a three-pronged fork-like construction. The left tine of the fork keeps the flail in place. The middle tine of the fork is used to transmit the release from the main arbor of the going train.

At the end of the main arbor of the going train, there are two pegs of metal mounted that turn with the main arbor once per hour. The first one is short (approximately 2 centimetres (0.79 in)), and the second is longer (approximately 10 centimetres (3.9 in)). They are at roughly a 90 degree angle. As the main arbor of the going train turns anti-clockwise, the first, short peg will push the fork up a little, which releases the flail and also moves the lock pin out of the count wheel. The flail turns clockwise until it hits the second, longer peg. This is the warning. A couple of minutes later, as the longer peg moves anti-clockwise, it completely releases the flail, which now turns clockwise whilst the clock strikes. As soon as a notch comes up on the count wheel, the fork dips again, and the left tine of the fork blocks the flail on its next turn.

=== Bell lever ===
Slightly below the centre of the main striking arbor, a pivot bracket goes to the left of the mechanism. This holds a lever that is pushed up as the hour pins of the main wheel move upwards. A steel wire connects the lever to a bell in the bell tower.
