= Robert Pickersgill Howgrave-Graham =

Robert Pickersgill Howgrave-Graham (sometimes Howgrave Graham) F.S.A., M.I.E.E. (9 July 1880 – 25 March 1959) was a British polymath. He trained as an electrical engineer and became a teacher, inventor and author but his lasting legacy, through his interest in archaeology, is his work as an antiquarian, historian and photographer. Often noted as a horologist, he became a specialist in medieval church clocks, and his research work on the clocks of both Wells and Salisbury Cathedrals is considered scholarship standard. Upon his retirement from teaching he pursued both his interest in photography and archaeology, becoming Assistant Keeper of the Muniments of Westminster Abbey.

== Early life and education ==
Robert Howgrave-Graham was born in Hampstead, London to Henry Howgrave Graham and Laura Julia (née Tennant). His father Henry was a registrar of patents, becoming first Secretary of the Chartered Institute of Patent Agents, who died just before the end of World War I. Robert's younger brother Hamilton Maurice Howgrave-Graham, C.B.E. (1882-1963) was a civil servant, a long-standing Secretary of the Metropolitan Police, who wrote two books Light and Shade at Scotland Yard and The Metropolitan Police at War about the service.

Both Robert and Hamilton were educated at Felsted School with Robert going on to study electrical engineering at the Finsbury Technical College under Silvanus P. Thompson between 1896 and 1899.

== Career ==
Howgrave-Graham published his first article while still a student and throughout his life he published books and articles on diverse subjects from x-rays to clocks to funeral effigies, and his work is often referenced.

=== Electrical engineering ===
Howgrave-Graham commenced his career at the place he studied, City and Guilds of London Technical College, Finsbury, working as a demonstrator. He moved on to teaching and research work, undertaking experimental work with electric oscillations and on wireless technology. He is acknowledged as a contributor to the early development of wireless telegraphy. The Science Museum, London has, in its collection, an experimental Lodge-Muirhead wireless telegraph receiver, designed and built by Howgrave-Graham in about 1905 which he gave to the museum in 1923. The construction of the receiver is described in his book Wireless Telegraphy for Amateurs.

Due to health issues, Howgrave-Graham did not see active service in the First World War but, alongside his continued teaching duties, he lectured artillery brigades on the principles of gunnery and on field telephony. He also undertook research work on naval wireless telegraphy.

Shortly after the war Howgrave-Graham took up the post of lecturer at Northampton Polytechnic, an institute of technology in Clerkenwell, where he worked from 1919 until his retirement in 1945.

== Clocks ==
Beside his teaching career, Howgrave-Graham pursued his outside interests, one of which was the workings of medieval clocks. In the late 1920s he gave a lecture to a meeting of the St Albans and Herts Architectural and Archaeological Society on Richard of Wallingford’s astronomical clock. At that time, he had already submitted a paper to the Society of Antiquaries of London questioning widely held views concerning the earliest appearance of clocks in Europe and in England.

After visiting Salisbury Cathedral and discovering the workings of an ancient clock, the horologist T. R. Robinson contacted Howgrave-Graham, who he had met while attending a lecture at Northampton Polytechnic that he described as “an inspirational speech on ancient turret clocks” to advise him of the find. After inspecting the clock, Howgrave-Graham worked with the friends of Salisbury Cathedral in having the clock brought down from the Great Tower and exhibited in the north transept of the cathedral. Howgrave-Graham continued to undertake research on the Salisbury clock and was instrumental in having the clock restored. He also undertook considerable research on the Wells Cathedral clock and promoted the theory that the Salisbury and Wells clocks were linked and from a contemporaneous period. The Wells Cathedral clock mechanism, which Howgrave-Graham helped to restore, is now exhibited at the Science Museum. His monograph, Peter Lightfoot - Monk of Glastonbury, and the Old Clock at Wells, was published in 1922.

== Westminster Abbey ==
Howgrave-Graham was appointed assistant keeper of the Muniments at Westminster Abbey in 1945 and continued in the post until his death in 1959.

During his time at the Abbey he worked painstakingly on the restoration of a number of wooden funeral effigies that had been severely damaged after an incendiary bomb attack and the subsequent water ingress. His conservation work on the earliest effigy of Edward III and the effigy of Henry VII is particularly noteworthy and revealed that the features were actual death masks. Various publications detail the work he carried out, for example, in the book Henry VII, the author Stanley B. Chrimes tells us how Howgrave-Graham “undertook with remarkable success the most formidable task of restoring the saturated, partly disintegrated effigies…” and in Funeral Effigies of Westminster Abbey it is acknowledged that his work and photographs together with a subsequent study by the Victoria and Albert Museum “revealed a great deal about the construction of the effigy head (of Henry VII)”.

Howgrave-Graham was made an honorary member of the Art Workers' Guild in 1952, having previously given a lecture on ‘Little Known Sculpture of Westminster Abbey’ to the Guild in 1940. He was also made a Fellow of the Society of Antiquaries of London.

== Photography ==
Both the Science Museum and Westminster Abbey extol Howgrave-Graham's prowess as a photographer. The Science Museum describes him as a “skilled photographer using it to record medieval church architecture” whilst the Abbey, whose library contains a large collection of his negatives, calls him “a gifted photographer”.

As J. Greig remarked in the obituary for Nature “photography was, for him (Howgrave-Graham), handmaiden to archaeology. The art of photographing the interesting and beautiful features of the architecture of medieval buildings was one at which he excelled and many of his photographs, some of striking beauty, have been reproduced in books on Gothic art.” An example being a photograph of Bristol Cathedral that appeared in the 1972 book Mediaeval Architect by John Harvey. Howgrave-Graham also took the photographs for the book Unknown Westminster Abbey by L. E. Tanner published in 1948.

As early as 1915 Howgrave-Graham exhibited and gave a lantern lecture at the annual exhibition of The Royal Photographic Society on Canterbury Cathedral.

The British Library has a set of twelve souvenir photographs of the coronation of King George VI on 12 May 1937, taken by Howgrave-Graham and photographs attributed to him are held in the archives of Historic England and also by the Conway Library whose archive of primarily architectural images is being digitised under the wider Courtauld Connects project.

== Private life ==
Howgrave-Graham married late in life after proposing to his housekeeper, Beatrice Purdy, during a World War II air raid. The couple were married in Westminster Abbey on 7 November 1944.

Robert Howgrave-Graham died on 25 March 1959 and his ashes are buried in the Islip Chapel in Westminster Abbey.

== Publications ==
- The Wells Clock, Wells : Friends of Wells Cathedral, 1971
- ‘The Earlier Royal Funeral Effigies, New Light on Portraiture at Westminster Abbey’ in Archaeologia, Vol. 98 1961, pp. 159–169
- The Cathedrals of France, London : B. T. Batsford, 1959
- ‘Salisbury & the West-Country Clocks’ in Antiquarian Horology, Vol.2/1, 1956
- ‘Automata at Salisbury’ in Antiquarian Horology, Vol.2/5, 1956
- ‘Royal Portraits in Effigy: Some New Discoveries in Westminster Abbey’ in Journal of the Royal Society of Arts, Vol. 101, No. 4900, 29 May 1953, pp. 465–474
- ‘Ancient Turret Clocks’ in Antiquarian Horology, Vol.1/3, 1953
- ‘New light on Ancient Turret Clocks’ in Antiquarian Horology, Vol.1/5, 1953
- ‘Westminster Abbey: Various Bosses, Capitals, and Corbels of the Thirteenth Century’ in Journal of the British Archaeological Association, Vol. 8, Iss.1, pp. 1–4, 1943
- The Dover Castle Clock; How Old is the Dover Castle Clock’ in The Watch and Clock Maker, Vol 4, 1931, pp. 52–53, 180-182
- X-Rays Simply Explained: A Handbook on Röntgen Rays in Theory and Practice, London : Percival Marshall & Co, 1928, Third Edition, London : Forgotten Books, 2018, ISBN 0656222085
- ‘A Great Cathedral Clock Rediscovered’ in Practical Clock and Watchmaker, November 1929, pp. 445–7
- ‘Some Clocks and Jacks, with Notes on the History of Horology’ in Archaeologia, Vol. 77 1928, pp. 257–312
- Peter Lightfoot - Monk of Glastonbury, and the Old Clock at Wells, Glastonbury : Avalon Press, 1922. Reprinted by Creative Media Partners, LLC, 2015, ISBN 9781296422295
- Wireless Telegraphy for Amateurs, 1907, London : Percival Marshall & Co, 1907
- X-Rays Simply Explained - A Handbook on the Theory and Practice of Radiography, originally published in 1904. Reprinted by Krauss Press, 2011, ISBN 1446527581
- ‘The Synchronising of Alternators’ with M.R. Gardner in Journal of the Institution of Electrical Engineers, Vol. 28, Issue 131, 1989, pp. 658–664
