= Verge escapement =

Early clock mechanism

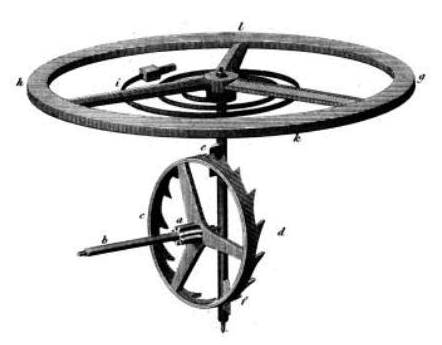
Verge escapement and balance wheel from an early pocketwatch

Verge and foliot escapement from De Vick tower clock, built in Paris, 1379, by Henri de Vick

The verge (or crown wheel) escapement is the earliest known type of mechanical escapement, the mechanism in a mechanical clock that controls its rate by allowing the gear train to advance at regular intervals, or ticks. Verge escapements were used from the late 13th century until the mid 19th century in clocks and pocketwatches. The name verge comes from the Latin virga, meaning "stick" or "rod".

Its invention is important in the history of technology, because it made possible the development of all-mechanical clocks. This caused a shift from measuring time by continuous processes, such as the flow of liquid in water clocks, to repetitive, oscillatory processes, such as the swing of pendulums, which had the potential to be more accurate. Oscillating timekeepers keep time for all modern clocks.

== Verge and foliot clocks ==
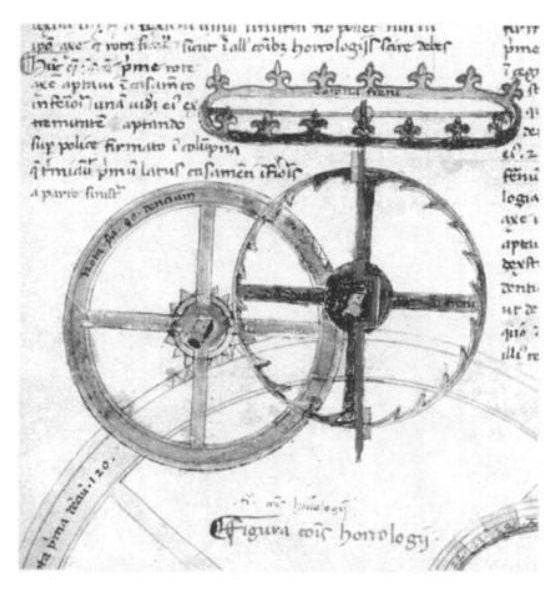
One of the earliest existing drawings of a verge escapement, in Giovanni de Dondi's astronomical clock, the Astrarium, built 1364, Padua, Italy. This had a balance wheel (crown shape at top) instead of a foliot. The escapement is just below it. From his 1364 clock treatise, Il Tractatus Astrarii.

The verge escapement dates from 13th-century Europe, where its invention led to the development of the first all-mechanical clocks. Starting in the 13th century, large tower clocks were built in European town squares, cathedrals, and monasteries. They kept time by using the verge escapement to drive a foliot, a primitive type of balance wheel. The foliot was a horizontal bar with weights near its ends affixed to a vertical bar called the verge which was suspended free to rotate. The verge escapement caused the foliot to oscillate back and forth about its vertical axis. The rate of the clock could be adjusted by moving the weights in or out on the foliot.

The verge escapement probably evolved from an alarm mechanism to ring a bell which had appeared centuries earlier. There has been speculation that Villard de Honnecourt invented the verge escapement in 1237 with an illustration of a strange mechanism to turn an angel statue to follow the sun with its finger, but the consensus is that this was not an escapement.

It is believed that sometime in the late 13th century the verge escapement mechanism was applied to tower clocks, creating the first mechanical escapement clock. In spite of the fact that these clocks were celebrated objects of civic pride which were written about at the time, it may never be known when the new escapement was first used. This is because it has proven difficult to distinguish from the meager written documentation which of these early tower clocks were mechanical, and which were water clocks; the same Latin word, horologe, was used for both. None of the original mechanisms have survived unaltered. Sources differ on which was the first clock 'known' to be mechanical, depending on which manuscript evidence they regard as conclusive. One candidate is the Dunstable Priory clock in Bedfordshire, England built in 1283, because accounts say it was installed above the rood screen, where it would be difficult to replenish the water needed for a water clock. Another is the clock built at the Palace of the Visconti, Milan, Italy, in 1335. Astronomer Robertus Anglicus wrote in 1271 that clockmakers were trying to invent an escapement, but hadn't been successful yet. However, there is agreement that mechanical clocks existed by the late 13th century.

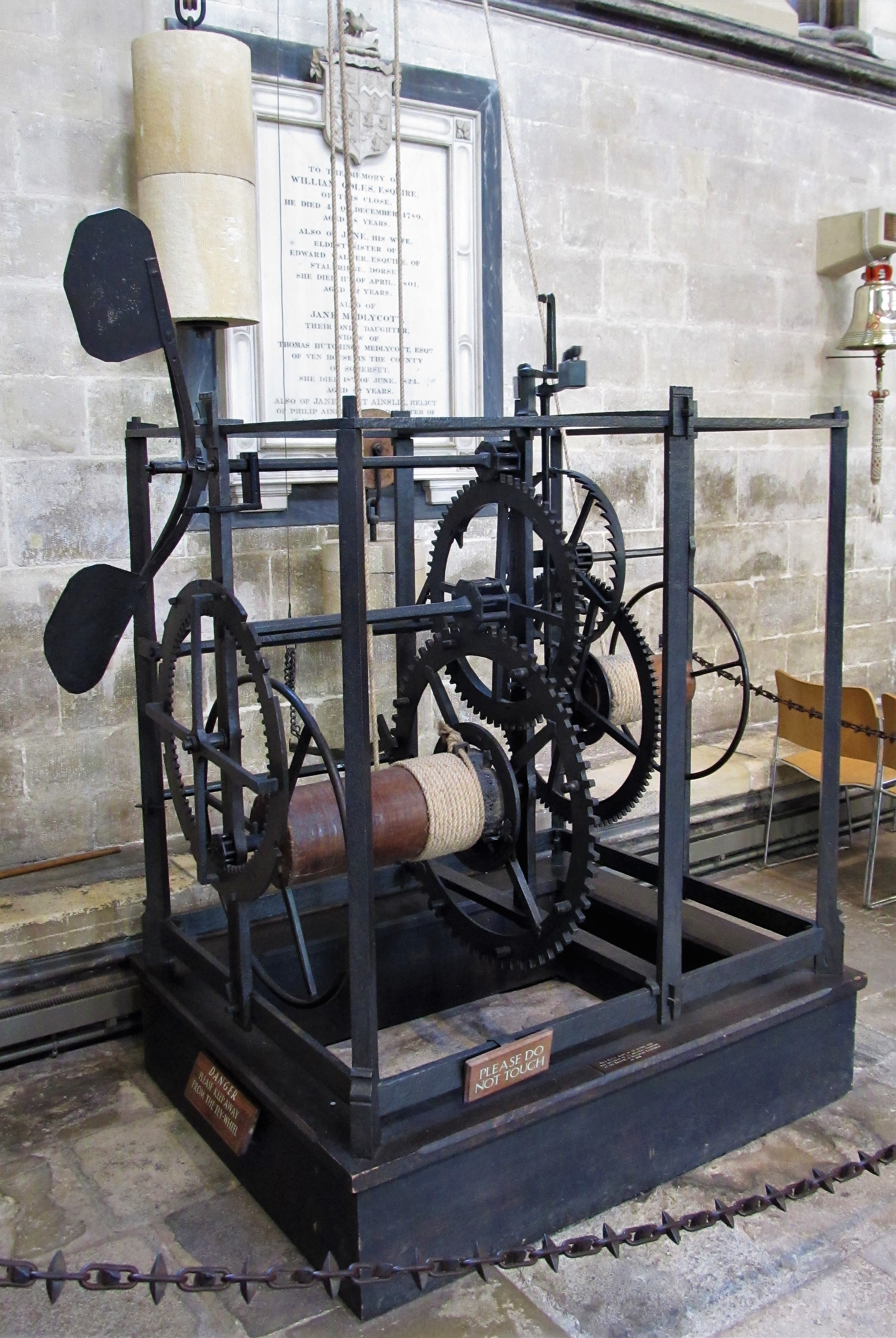
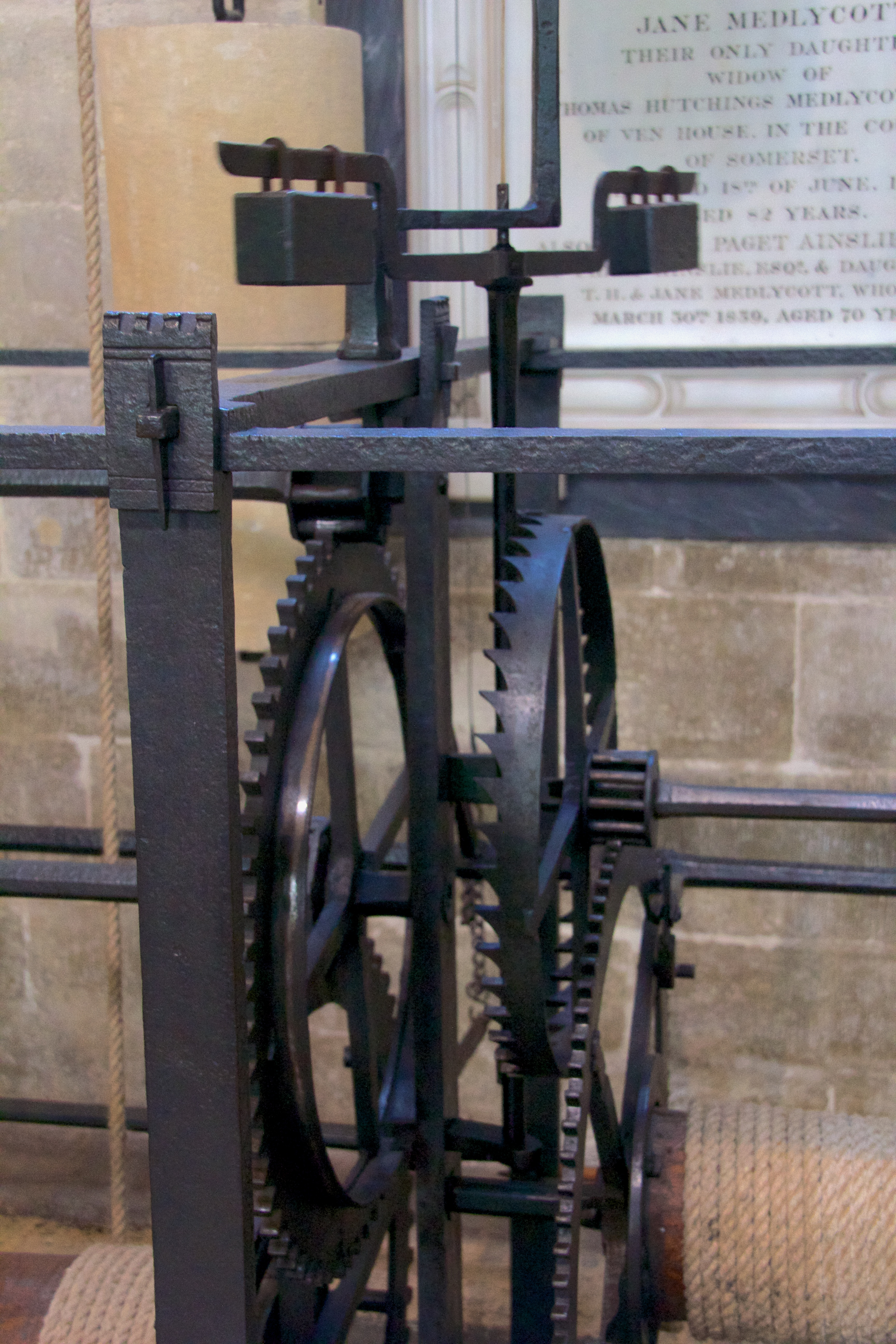
Salisbury Cathedral clock, 1386?, Salisbury, England, shows what the first verge clocks looked like. It did not have a clock face but was built to ring the hours. The few original verge clock mechanisms like this surviving from the Middle Ages have all been extensively modified. This example, like others, was found with the original verge and foliot replaced by a pendulum; a reproduction verge and foliot, shown in the righthand picture, was added in 1956.

The earliest description of an escapement, in Richard of Wallingford's 1327 manuscript Tractatus Horologii Astronomici on the clock he built at the Abbey of St. Albans, was not a verge, but a variation called a 'strob' escapement. It consisted of a pair of escape wheels on the same axle, with alternating radial teeth. The verge rod was suspended between them, with a short crosspiece that rotated first in one direction and then the other as the staggered teeth pushed past. Although no other example is known, it is possible that this design preceded the more usual verge in clocks.

For the first two hundred years or so of the mechanical clock's existence, the verge, with foliot or balance wheel, was the only escapement used in mechanical clocks. In the sixteenth century alternative escapements started to appear, but the verge remained the most used escapement for 350 years until mid-17th century advances in mechanics, resulted in the adoption of the pendulum, and later the anchor escapement. Since clocks were valuable, after the invention of the pendulum many verge clocks were rebuilt to use this more accurate timekeeping technology, so very few of the early verge and foliot clocks have survived unaltered to the present day.

How accurate the first verge and foliot clocks were is debatable, with estimates of one to two hours error per day being mentioned, although modern experiments with clocks of this construction show accuracies of minutes per day were achievable with enough care in design and maintenance. Early verge clocks were probably no more accurate than the previous water clocks, but they did not require water to be manually hauled to fill the reservoir, did not freeze in winter, and were a more promising technology for innovation. By the mid-17th century, when the pendulum replaced the foliot, the best verge and foliot clocks had achieved an accuracy of 15 minutes per day.

== Verge pendulum clocks ==
Most of the gross inaccuracy of the early verge and foliot clocks was due not to the escapement itself, but to the foliot oscillator. The first use of pendulums in clocks around 1656 suddenly increased the accuracy of the verge clock from hours a day to minutes a day. Most clocks were rebuilt with their foliots replaced by pendulums, to the extent that it is difficult to find original verge and foliot clocks intact today. A similar increase in accuracy in verge watches followed the introduction of the balance spring in 1658.

== How it works ==
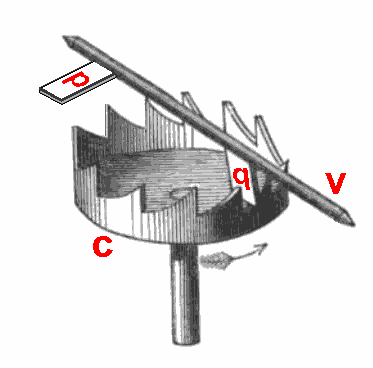
Verge escapement showing (c) crown wheel, (v) verge, (p,q) pallets

Verge escapement in motion

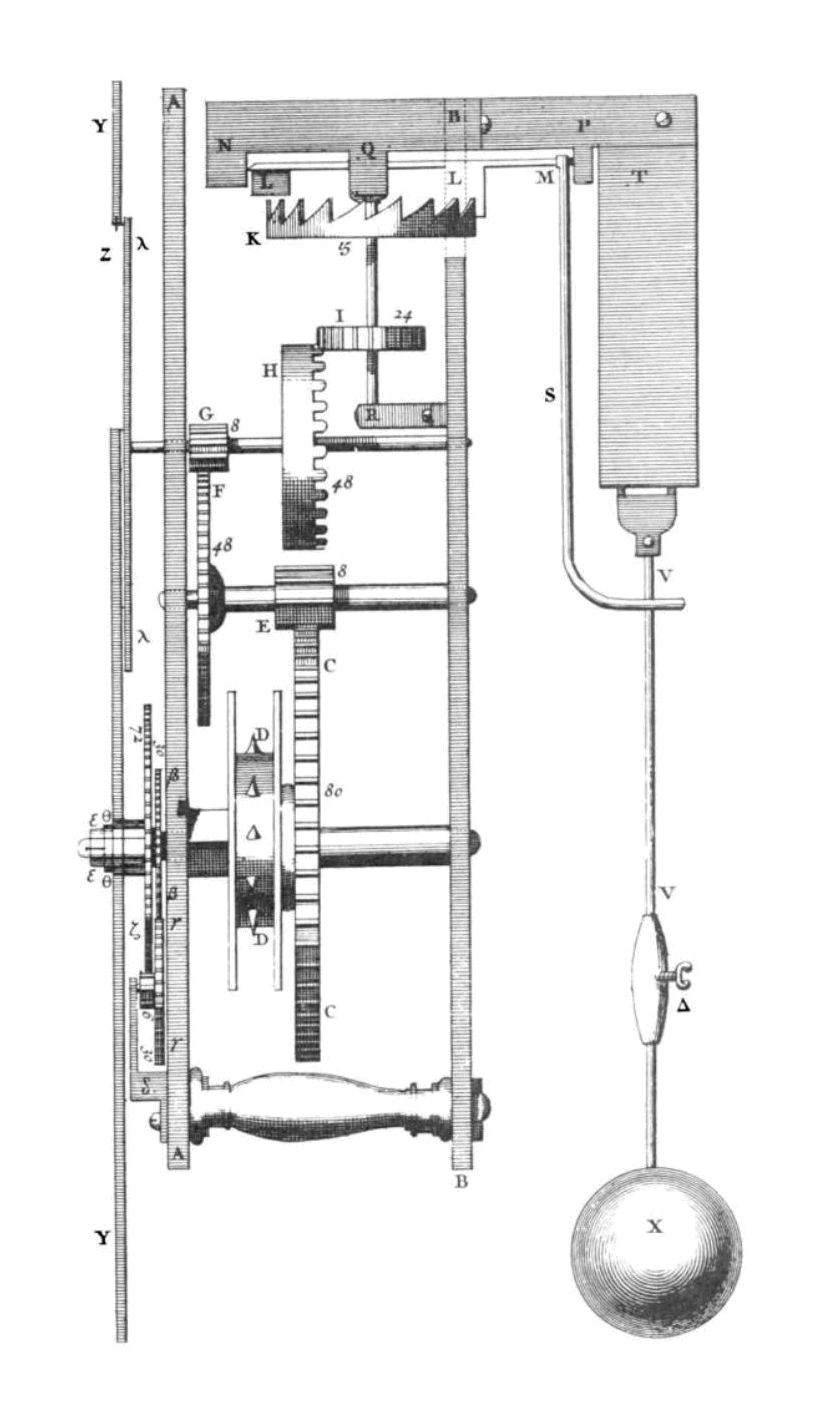
The second verge pendulum clock built by Christiaan Huygens, inventor of the pendulum clock, 1673. Huygens claimed an accuracy of 10 seconds per day. In a pendulum clock, the verge escapement is turned 90 degrees so that the crown wheel faces up (top).

The verge escapement consists of a wheel shaped like a crown, called the escape wheel, with sawtooth-shaped teeth protruding axially toward the front, and with its axis oriented horizontally. In front of it is a vertical rod, the verge, with two metal plates, the pallets, that engage the teeth of the escape wheel at opposite sides. The pallets are not parallel, but are oriented with an angle in between them so only one catches the teeth at a time. Attached to the verge at its top is an inertial oscillator, a balance wheel or in the earliest clocks a foliot, a horizontal beam with weights on either end. This is the timekeeper of the clock.

As the clock's gears turn the crown wheel (see animation), one of its teeth catches on a pallet, pushing on it. This rotates the verge and foliot in one direction, and rotates the second pallet into the path of the teeth on the opposite side of the wheel, until the tooth slides off the end of the pallet, releasing it. Then the crown wheel rotates freely a short distance until a tooth on the wheel's opposite side contacts the second pallet, pushing on it. This reverses the direction of the verge rod and foliot, rotating the verge back the other direction, until this tooth pushes past the second pallet. Then the cycle repeats. The result is to change the rotary motion of the wheel to an oscillating motion of the verge and foliot. Each swing of the balance wheel thus allows one tooth of the escape wheel to pass, advancing the wheel train of the clock by a fixed amount, moving the hands forward at a constant rate. The moment of inertia of the foliot or balance wheel controls the oscillation rate, determining the rate of the clock. The escape wheel tooth, pushing against the pallet each swing, provides an impulse which replaces the energy lost by the foliot to friction, keeping it oscillating back and forth.

In a verge pendulum clock (see picture) which appeared after the pendulum was invented in 1656, the escapement was turned 90° so the verge rod was horizontal, while the escape wheel's axis was vertical, located under the verge rod. In the first pendulum clocks the pendulum was attached to the end of the verge rod instead of the balance wheel or foliot. In later pendulum clocks the pendulum was suspended by a short straight spring of metal ribbon from the clock frame, and a vertical arm attached to the end of the verge rod ended in a fork which embraced the pendulum rod; this avoided the friction of suspending the pendulum directly from the pivoted verge rod. Each swing of the pendulum released an escape wheel tooth.

The escape wheel must have an odd number of teeth for the escapement to function. With an even number, two opposing teeth will contact the pallets at the same time, jamming the escapement. The usual angle between the pallets was 90° to 105°, resulting in a foliot or pendulum swing of around 80° to 100°. In order to reduce the pendulum's swing to make it more isochronous, the French used larger pallet angles, upward of 115°. This reduced the pendulum swing to around 50° and reduced recoil (below), but required the verge to be located so near the crown wheel that the teeth fell on the pallets very near the axis, reducing initial leverage and increasing friction, thus requiring lighter pendulums.

== Disadvantages ==
As might be expected from its early invention, the verge is the most inaccurate of the widely used escapements. It suffers from these problems:

- Verge watches and clocks are sensitive to changes in the drive force; they slow down as the mainspring unwinds. This is called lack of isochronism. It was much worse in verge and foliot clocks due to the lack of a balance spring, but is a problem in all verge movements. In fact, the standard method of adjusting the rate of early verge watches was to alter the force of the mainspring. The cause of this problem is that the crown wheel teeth are always pushing on the pallets, driving the pendulum or balance wheel throughout its cycle; the timekeeping element is never allowed to swing freely. Thus a decreasing drive force causes the pendulum or balance wheel to swing back and forth more slowly. All verge watches and spring driven clocks required fusees to equalize the force of the mainspring to achieve even minimal accuracy.
- The escapement has "recoil", meaning that the momentum of the foliot or pendulum pushes the crown wheel backward momentarily, causing the clock's wheel train to move backward, during part of its cycle. This increases friction and wear, resulting in inaccuracy. One way to tell whether an antique watch has a verge escapement is to observe the second hand closely; if it moves backward a little during each cycle, the watch is a verge. This is not necessarily the case in clocks, as there are some other pendulum escapements which exhibit recoil.
- In pendulum clocks, the wide pendulum swing angles of 80°-100° required by the verge cause an additional lack of isochronism due to circular error.
- The wide pendulum swings also cause a lot of air friction, reducing the accuracy of the pendulum, and requiring a lot of power to keep it going, increasing wear. So verge pendulum clocks had lighter bobs, which reduced accuracy.
- Verge timepieces tend to accelerate as the crown wheel and the pallets wear down. This is particularly evident in verge watches from the mid-18th century onward. It is not in the least unusual for these watches, when run today, to gain many hours per day, or to simply spin as if there were no balance present. The reason for this is that as new escapements were invented, it became the fashion to have a thin watch. To achieve this in a verge watch requires the crown wheel to be made very small, magnifying the effects of wear.

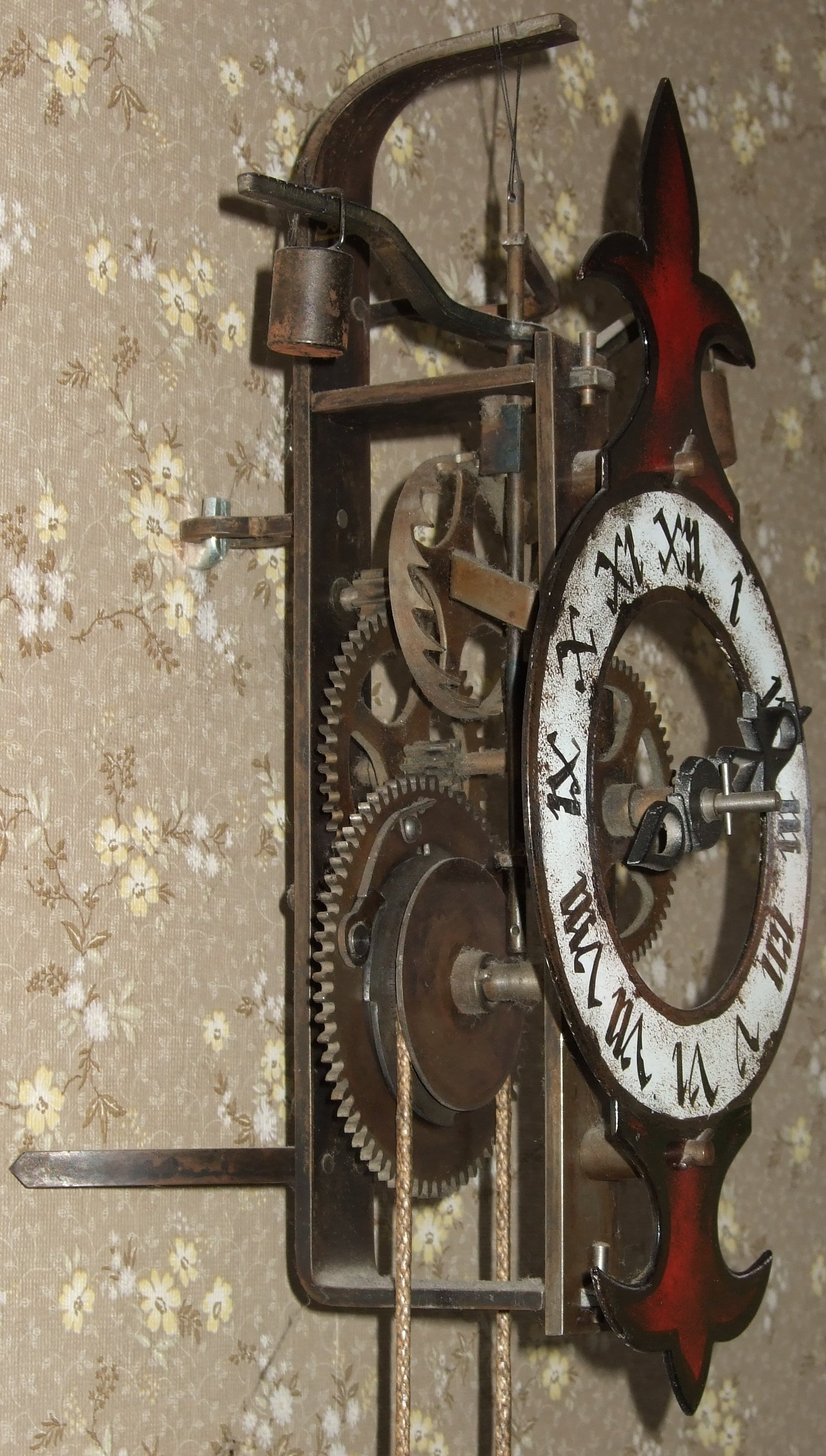
Modern reproduction of an early verge and foliot clock. The pointed-tooth verge wheel is visible, with the wooden foliot rod and suspended weight above it.

== Decline ==
Verge escapements were used in virtually all clocks and watches for 400 years. Then the increase in accuracy due to the introduction of the pendulum and balance spring in the mid 17th century focused attention on error caused by the escapement. By the 1820s, the verge was superseded by better escapements, though inexpensive verge watches continued to be made through the 19th century.

In pocketwatches, besides its inaccuracy, the vertical orientation of the crown wheel and the need for a bulky fusee made the verge movement unfashionably thick. French watchmakers adopted the thinner cylinder escapement, invented in 1695. In England, high end watches went to the duplex escapement, developed in 1782, but relatively inexpensive verge fusee watches continued to be produced until the mid 19th century, when the lever escapement took over. These later verge watches were colloquially called 'turnips' because of their bulky build.

The verge was only used briefly in pendulum clocks before it was replaced by the anchor escapement, invented around 1660 probably by Robert Hooke, and widely used beginning in 1680. The problem with the verge was that it required the pendulum to swing in a wide arc of 80° to 100°. Christiaan Huygens in 1674 showed that a pendulum swinging in a wide arc is an inaccurate timekeeper, because its period of swing is sensitive to small changes in the drive force provided by the clock mechanism.

Although the verge is not known for accuracy, it is capable of it. The first successful marine chronometers, H4 and H5, made by John Harrison in 1759 and 1770, used verge escapements with diamond pallets., In trials they were accurate to within a fifth of a second per day.

Today the verge is seen only in antique or antique-replica timepieces. Many original bracket clocks have their Victorian-era anchor escapement conversions undone and the original style of verge escapement restored. Clockmakers call this a verge reconversion.

== See also ==
- Galileo's escapement – the first proposed pendulum clock escapement by Galileo Galilei.
- Dover Castle Clock – the oldest-known operating clock with its original verge and foliot escapement, now in the Science Museum, London.
