= Ticker =

Ticker can mean:

- Crotopsalta, a genus of cicadas known as 'tickers'
- Heart, informally
- Mechanical watch, informally
- News ticker, a small screen space on television news dedicated to headlines or minor pieces of news
- A rich media self-updating graphic added to the signature of an online chat profile that serves as a countdown to an important event
- Ticker (2001 film), an action film directed by Albert Pyun
- Ticker (play), a British play about a sudden and unexplained death
- Ticker tape, the paper strip output by a stock ticker machine
- Ticker symbol, codes used to uniquely identify publicly traded companies on a stock market

== See also ==
- Tikka (disambiguation)
