= Neueuhren =

NeueUhren.de
- Editor: Hans Hörl
- Categories: Mechanical watch
- Format: Online magazine
- Publisher: Media Service Partner
- First issue: June 2012
- Country: Germany
- Language: German
- Website: www.neueuhren.de

NeueUhren.de is a German-language, digital special interest interest magazine aimed at those interested in mechanical watches and time measurement. It is published online.

The magazine offers information about new mechanical watches with price and technical specifications. Reports on visits to watch manufacturers and background information on watch companies are also among the editorial topics. It competes with blogs such as Zeigr.com, Herrstrohmsuhrsachen.com and Chronautix.com.
