= Mainspring =

Spring used as clockwork power source

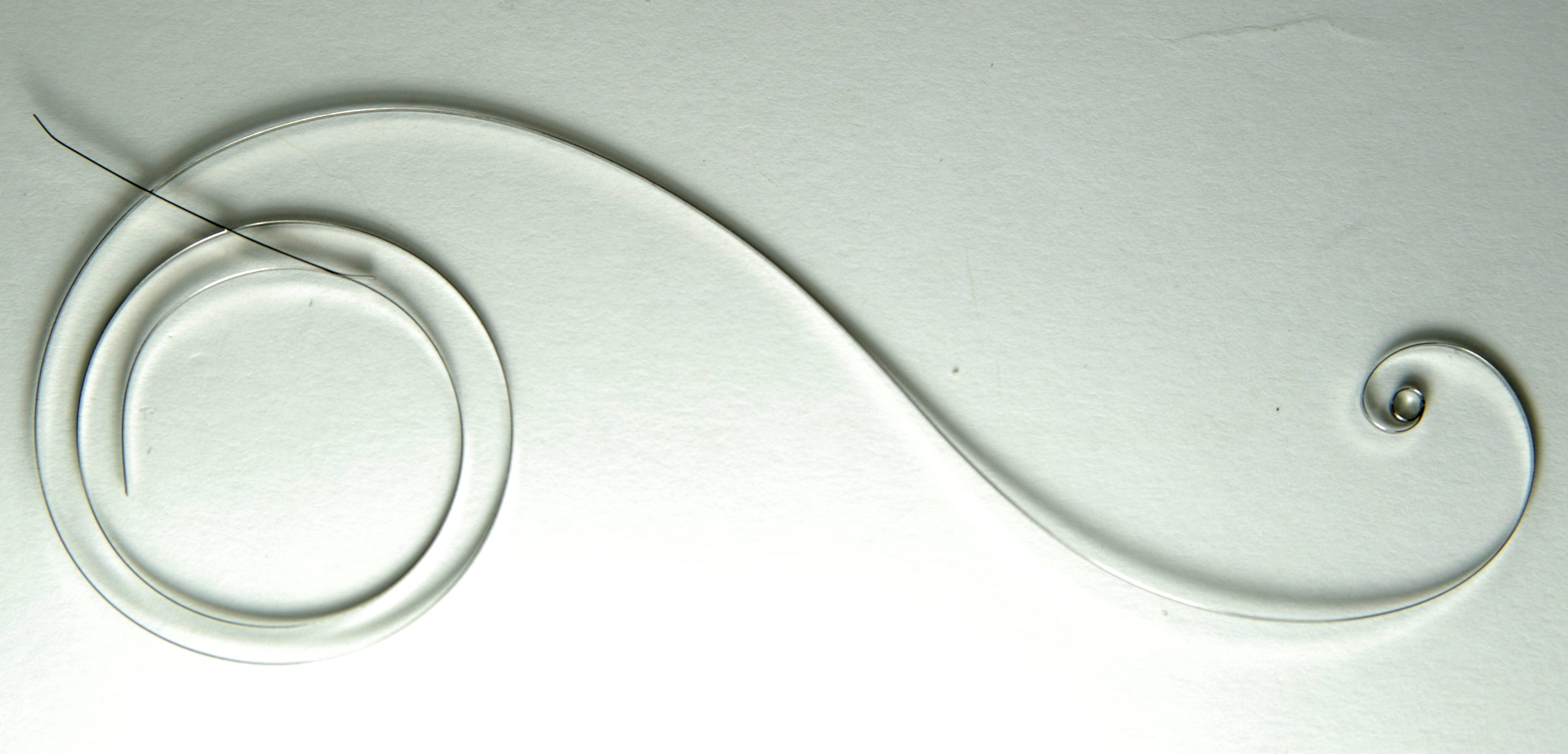
An uncoiled modern watch mainspring.

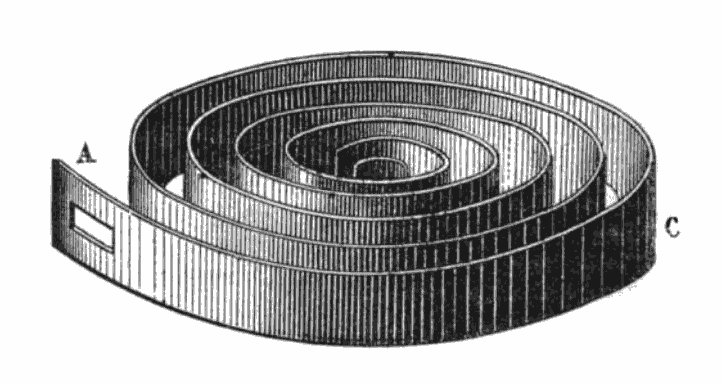
Clock mainspring

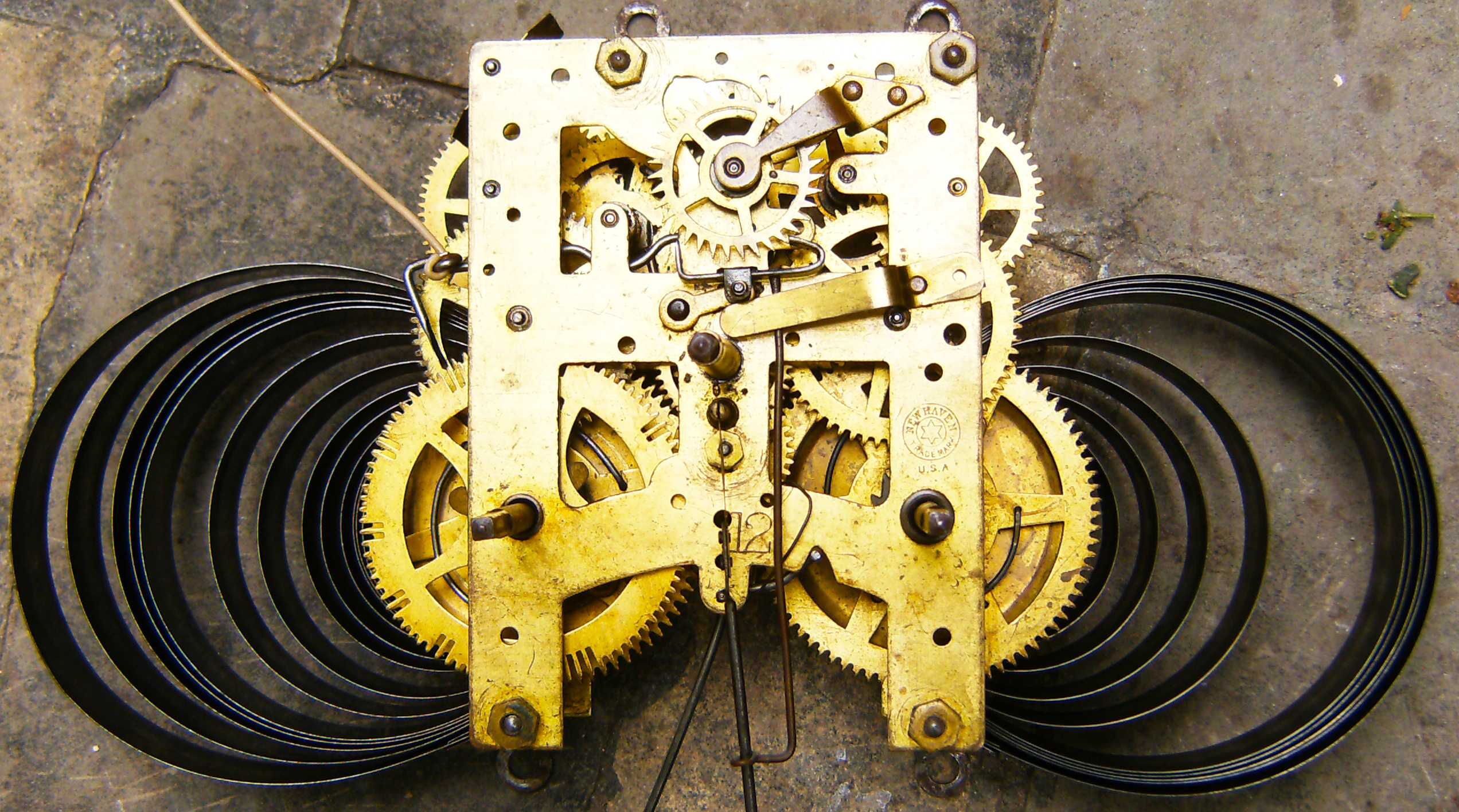
A pendulum wall clock movement showing the two mainsprings which power it. This is a striking clock which sounds the hours on a chime; one of the springs powers the timekeeping gear train while the other powers the striking train.

A mainspring is a spiral torsion spring of metal ribbon—commonly spring steel—used as a power source in mechanical watches, some clocks, and other clockwork mechanisms. Winding the timepiece, by turning a knob or key, stores energy in the mainspring by twisting the spiral tighter. The force of the mainspring then turns the clock's wheels as it unwinds, until the next winding is needed. The adjectives wind-up and spring-powered refer to mechanisms powered by mainsprings, which also include kitchen timers, metronomes, music boxes, wind-up toys and clockwork radios.

Mainsprings appeared in the first spring-powered clocks in 15th-century Europe. The mainspring replaced the weight hanging from a cord wrapped around a pulley, which was the power source used in all previous mechanical clock.

== Modern mainsprings ==
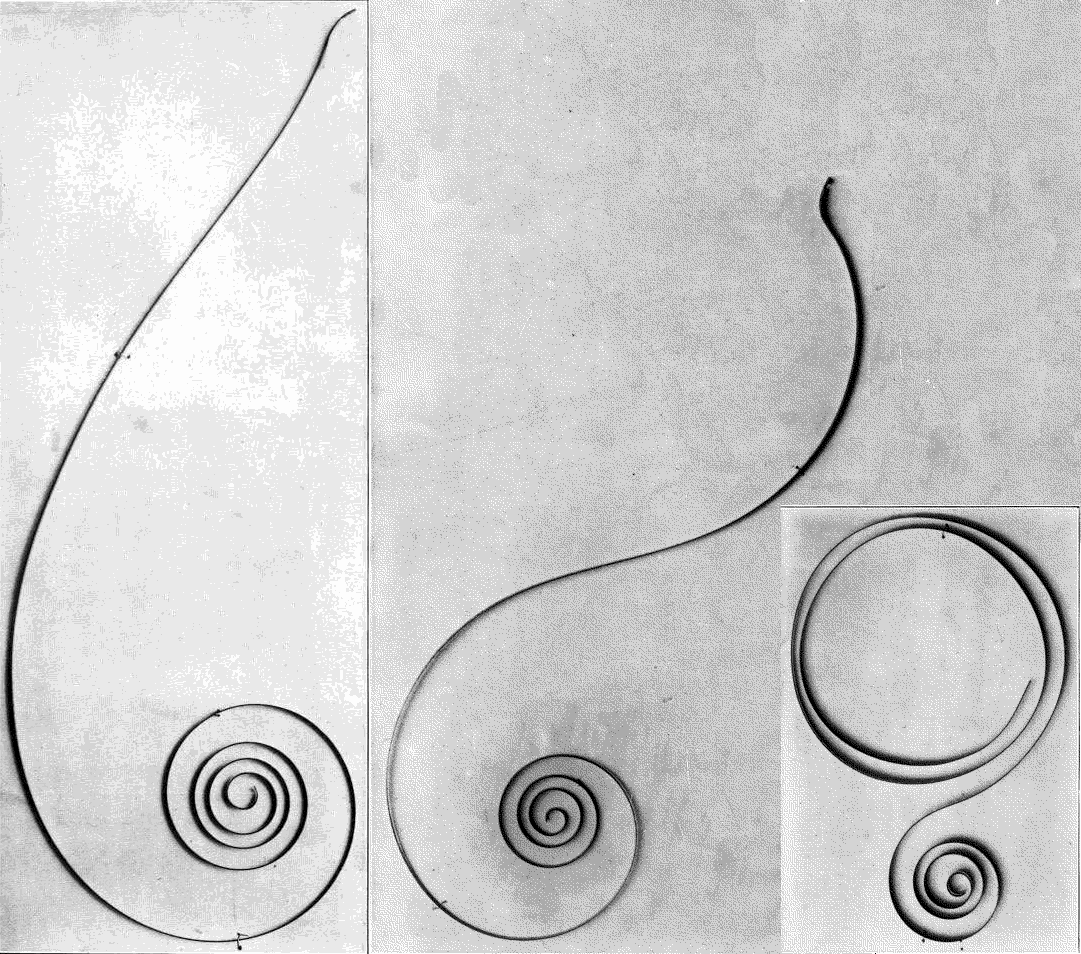
Elgin pocketwatch mainsprings from around 1910, showing the three types (l-r): spiral, semi-reverse, reverse.

A modern watch mainspring is a long strip of hardened and blued steel, or specialised steel alloy, 20–30 cm long and 0.05-0.2 mm thick. The mainspring in the common 1-day movement is calculated to enable the watch to run for 36 to 40 hours, i.e. 24 hours between daily windings with a power-reserve of 12 to 16 hours, in case the owner is late winding the watch. This is the normal standard for hand-wound as well as self-winding watches. 8-Day movements, used in clocks meant to be wound weekly, provide power for at least 192 hours but use longer mainsprings and bigger barrels. Clock mainsprings are similar to watch springs, only larger.

Since 1945, carbon steel alloys have been increasingly superseded by newer special alloys (iron, nickel and chromium with the addition of cobalt, molybdenum, or beryllium), and also by cold-rolled alloys (structural hardening). Known to watchmakers as "white metal" springs (as opposed to blued carbon steel), these are stainless and have a higher elastic limit. They are less subject to permanent bending (becoming tired) and there is scarcely any risk of their breaking. Some of them are also practically non-magnetic. Proprietary alloys include SPRON made by Seiko and Nivarox by Swatch Group.

In their relaxed form, mainsprings are made in three distinct shapes:

- Spiral coiled: These are coiled in the same direction throughout, in a simple spiral.
- Semi-reverse: The outer end of the spring is coiled in the reverse direction for less than one turn (less than 360°).
- Reverse (resilient): the outer end of the spring is coiled in the reverse direction for one or more turns (exceeding 360°).

The semi-reverse and reverse types provide extra force at the end of the running period, when the spring is almost out of energy, in order to keep the timepiece running at a constant rate to the end.

== Operation ==
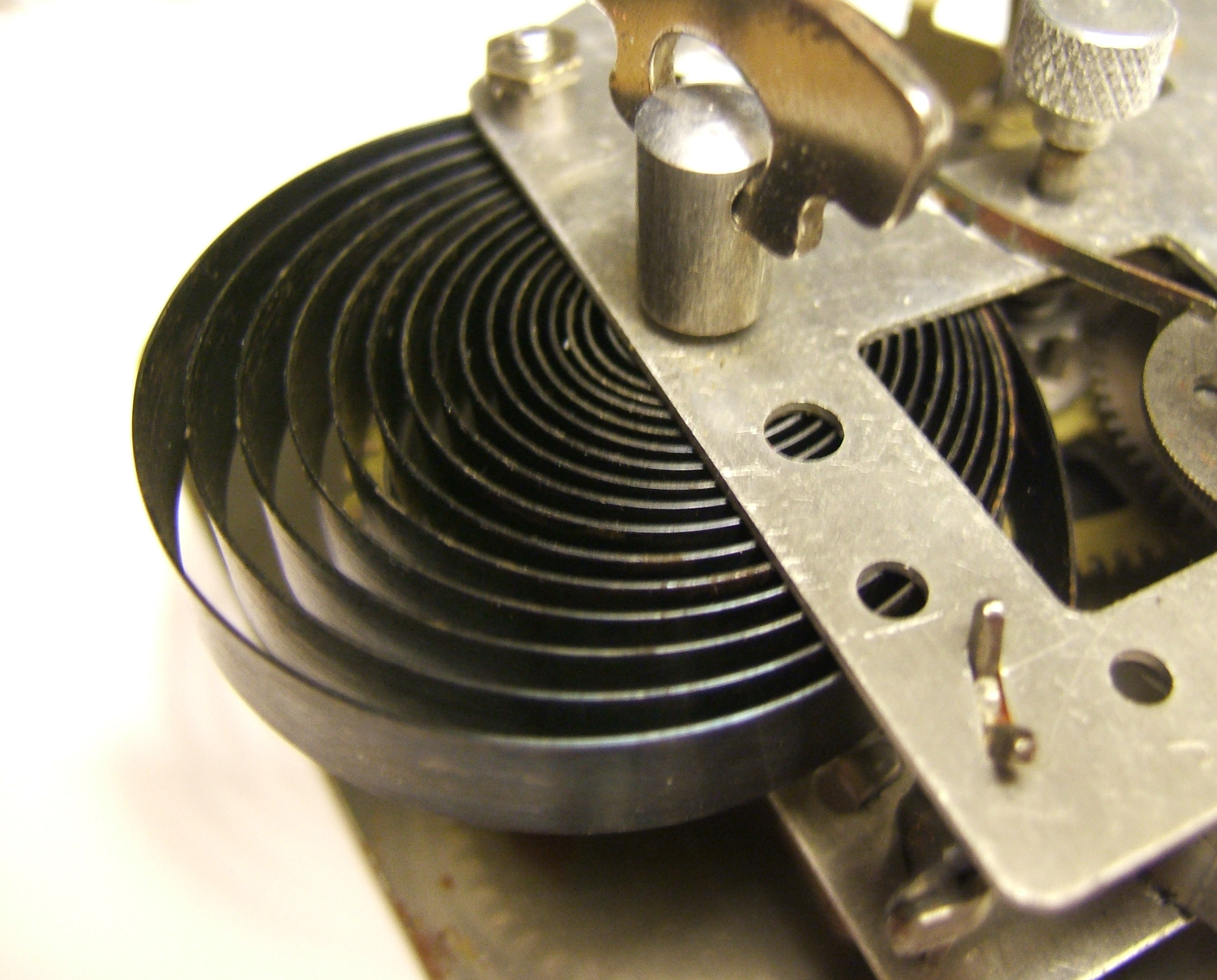
Mainspring in a 1950s alarm clock. The end of the spring is attached to the frame post at lower right.

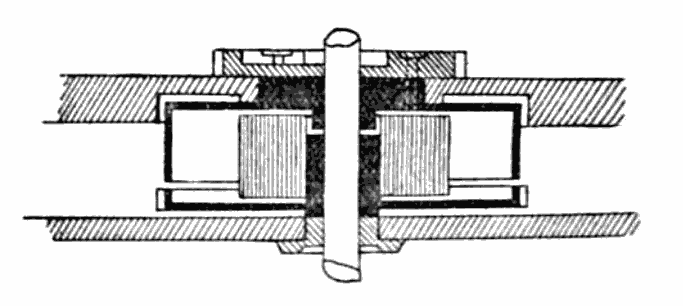
Cross section of a going barrel in a watch (mainspring fully wound).

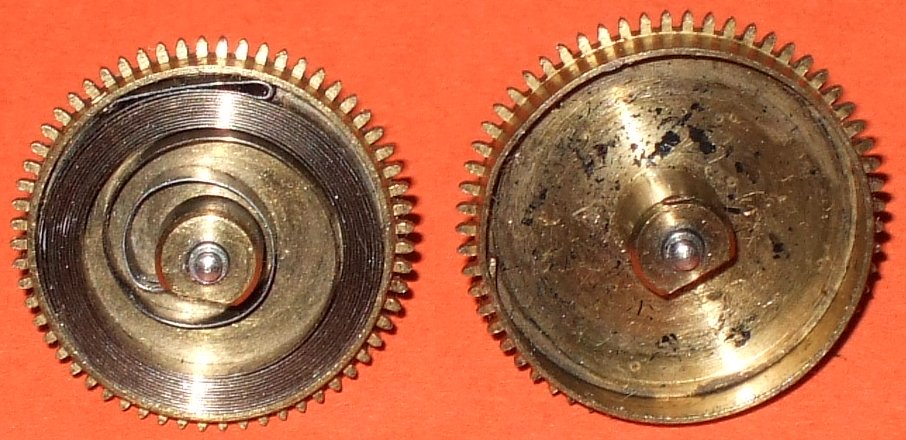
Going barrel of a watch, opened.

The mainspring is coiled around an axle called the arbor, with the inner end hooked to it. In many clocks, the outer end is attached to a stationary post. The spring is wound up by turning the arbor, and after winding its force turns the arbor the other way to run the clock. The disadvantage of this open spring arrangement is that while the mainspring is being wound, its drive force is removed from the clock movement, so the clock may stop. This type is often used on alarm clocks, music boxes and kitchen timers where it doesn't matter if the mechanism stops while winding. The winding mechanism always has a ratchet attached, with a pawl (called by clockmakers the click) to prevent the spring from unwinding.

In the form used in modern watches, called the going barrel, the mainspring is coiled around an arbor and enclosed inside a cylindrical box called the barrel which is free to turn. The spring is attached to the arbor at its inner end, and to the barrel at its outer end. The attachments are small hooks or tabs, which the spring is hooked to by square holes in its ends, so it can be easily replaced.

The mainspring is wound by turning the arbor, but drives the watch movement by the barrel; this arrangement allows the spring to continue powering the watch while it is being wound. Winding the watch turns the arbor, which tightens the mainspring, wrapping it closer around the arbor. The arbor has a ratchet attached to it, with a click to prevent the spring from turning the arbor backward and unwinding. After winding, the arbor is stationary and the pull of the mainspring turns the barrel, which has a ring of gear teeth around it. This meshes with one of the clock's gears, usually the center wheel pinion and drives the wheel train. The barrel usually rotates once every 8 hours, so the common 40-hour spring requires 5 turns to unwind completely.

=== Hazards ===
The mainspring contains a lot of energy. Clocks and watches need to be serviced, cleaned and lubricated periodically, and if precautions are not taken during disassembly the spring can release suddenly, causing potentially serious injury. Before servicing, mainsprings are “let down” gently by pulling the click back while holding the winding key, allowing the spring to slowly unwind. However, even in their “let down” state, mainsprings contain dangerous residual tension. Watchmakers and clockmakers use a tool called a "mainspring winder" to safely install and remove them. Large mainsprings in clocks are immobilized by "mainspring clamps" before removal.

== History ==
Mainsprings appeared in the first spring-powered clocks, in 15th-century Europe. They replaced the weight hanging from a cord wrapped around a pulley, which was the power source used in all previous mechanical clocks. Around the year 1400, coiled springs began to be used in locks, and many early clockmakers were also locksmiths. Springs were applied to clocks to make them smaller and more portable than previous weight-driven clocks, evolving into the first pocketwatches by 1600. Many sources erroneously credit the invention of the mainspring to the Nuremberg clockmaker Peter Henlein (also spelled Henle, or Hele) around 1511. However, there are many references in 15th-century sources to portable clocks 'without weights', and at least two surviving examples, which show that spring-driven clocks existed by the early years of that century. The oldest surviving clock powered by a mainspring is the Burgunderuhr (Burgundy Clock), an ornate, gilt chamber clock, currently at the Germanisches Nationalmuseum in Nuremberg, whose iconography suggests that it was made around 1430 for Philip the Good, Duke of Burgundy.

The first mainsprings were made of steel without tempering or hardening processes. They didn't run very long, and had to be wound twice a day. Henlein was noted for making watches that would run 40 hours between windings. The 18th century methods of making mainsprings are described by Berthoud and Blakey

=== Constant force from a spring ===
Torque curve of a mainspring. The force (torque) it provides decreases linearly as it unwinds.

Torque curves of mainsprings in going barrels (1879). The flatter central section provides more constant force during the running period, allowing the clock movement to keep better time.

A problem throughout the history of spring-driven clocks and watches is that the force (torque) provided by a spring is not constant, but diminishes as the spring unwinds (see graph). However, timepieces have to run at a constant rate in order to keep accurate time. Timekeeping mechanisms are never perfectly isochronous, meaning their rate is affected by changes in the drive force. This was especially true of the primitive verge and foliot type used before the advent of the balance spring in 1657. As a result, early clocks slowed down during their running period as the mainspring ran down, causing inaccurate timekeeping.

Two solutions to this problem appeared in the early spring-powered clocks in the 15th century; the stackfreed and the fusee:

==== Stackfreed ====
The stackfreed was an eccentric cam mounted on the mainspring arbor, with a spring-loaded roller that pressed against it. The cam had a 'snail' shape so that early in the running period when the mainspring was pushing strongly, the spring would bear against the wide part of the cam, providing a strong opposing force, while later in the running period as the force of the mainspring decreased, the spring would bear against the narrower part of the cam and the opposing force would also decrease. The stackfreed added a lot of friction and probably reduced a clock's running time substantially; it was only used in some German timepieces and was abandoned after about a century.

==== Fusee ====
The fusee was a much longer-lasting innovation. This was a cone-shaped pulley that was turned by a chain wrapped around the mainspring barrel. Its curving shape continuously changed the mechanical advantage of the linkage to even out the force of the mainspring as it ran down. Fusees became the standard method of getting constant torque from a mainspring. They were used in most spring-driven clocks and watches from their first appearance until the 19th century when the going barrel took over, and in marine chronometers until the 1970s.

==== Stopwork ====
Another early device which helped even out the spring's force was stopwork or winding stops, which prevented the mainspring from being wound up all the way, and prevented it from unwinding all the way. The idea was to use only the central part of the spring's 'torque curve', where its force was more constant. The most common form was the Geneva stop or 'Maltese cross'. Stopwork isn't needed in modern watches.

==== Remontoire ====
A fourth device used in a few precision timepieces was the remontoire. This was a small secondary spring or weight which powered the timepiece's escapement, and was itself rewound periodically by the mainspring. This isolated the timekeeping element from the varying mainspring force.

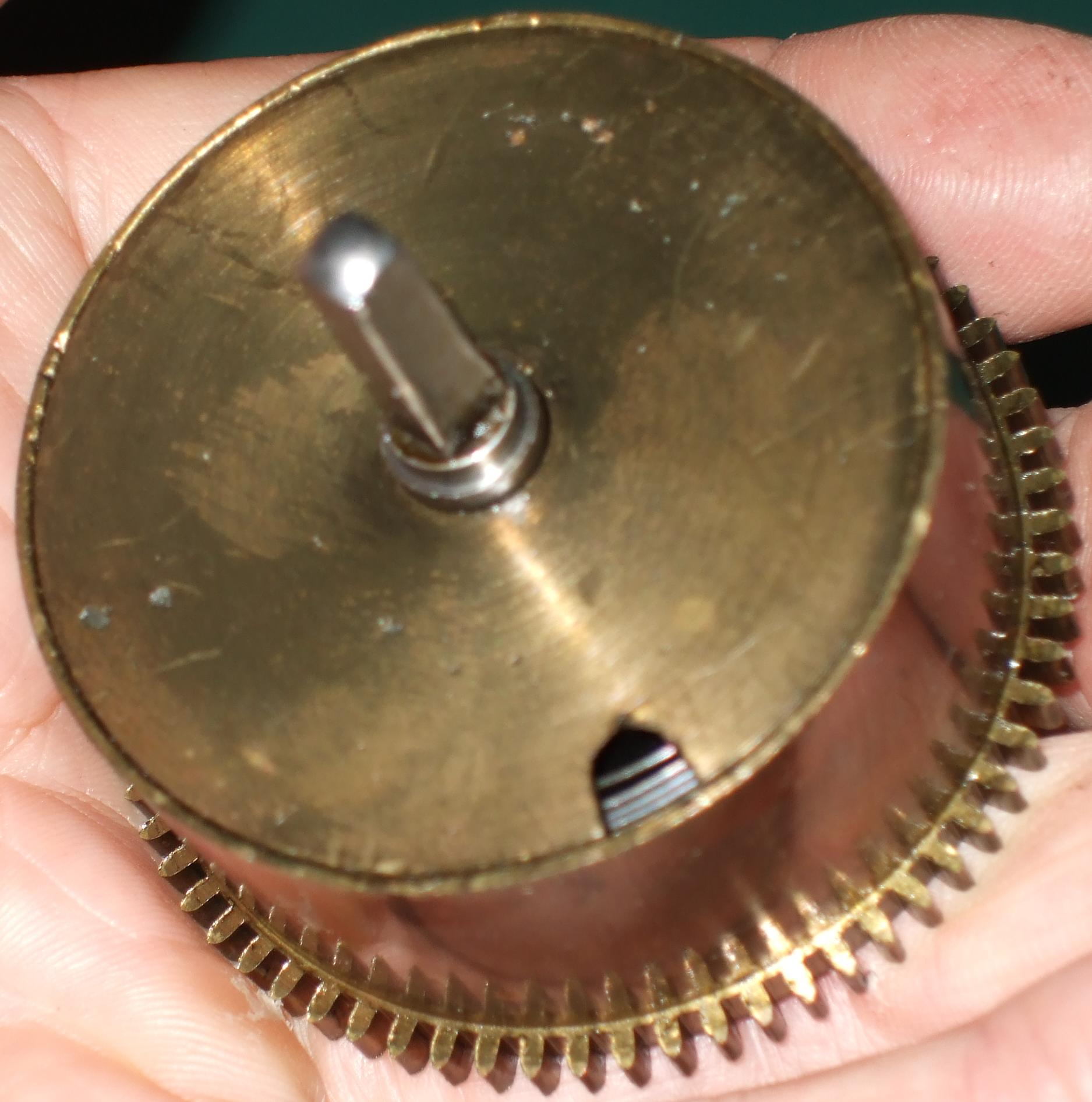
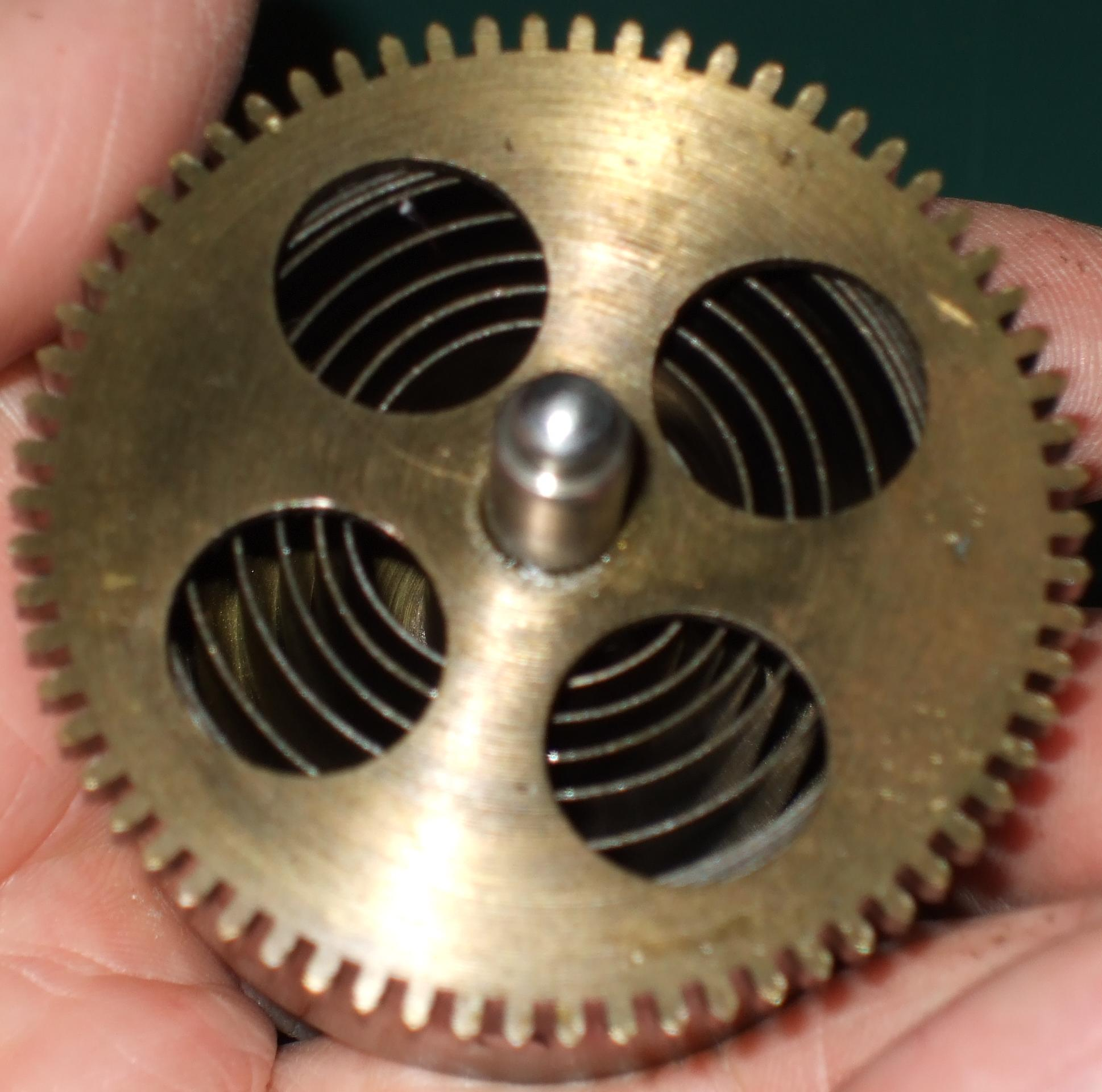
Clock going barrel

==== Going barrel ====
The modern going barrel, invented in 1760 by Jean-Antoine Lépine, produces a constant force by simply using a longer mainspring than needed, and coiling it under tension in the barrel. In operation, only a few turns of the spring at a time are used, with the remainder pressed against the outer wall of the barrel. Mathematically, the tension creates a 'flat' section in the spring's torque curve (see graph) and only this flat section is used. In addition, the outer end of the spring is often given a reverse curve, so it has an "S" shape. This stores more tension in the spring's outer turns where it is available toward the end of the running period. The result is that the barrel provides approximately constant torque over the watch's designed running period; the torque doesn't decline until the mainspring has almost run down.

The built-in tension of the spring in the going barrel makes it hazardous to disassemble even when not wound up.

== Broken mainsprings ==
Because they are subjected to constant stress cycles, up until the 1960s mainsprings generally broke from metal fatigue long before other parts of the timepiece. They were considered expendable items. This often happened at the end of the winding process, when the spring is wound as tightly as possible around the arbor, with no space between the coils. When manually winding, it is easy to reach this point unexpectedly and put excessive pressure on the spring. Another cause was temperature changes. If a watch was fully wound in the evening and the temperature dropped at night, without any slack between the coils the thermal contraction of the long spring could break it loose from its attachments at one end. In earlier times, watch repairers noted that changes in the weather brought in a rash of watches with broken mainsprings. Broken mainsprings were the largest cause of watch repairs until the 1960s. Since then, the improvements in spring metallurgy mentioned above have made broken mainsprings rare.

=== 'Knocking' or 'banking' ===
Even if the mainsprings were not prone to breakage, too much force during winding caused another problem in early watches, called 'knocking' or 'banking'. If very little slack was left in the spring after winding ('overwinding"), the pressure of the last turn of the winding knob put the end of the spring under excessive tension, which was locked in by the last click of the ratchet. So the watch ran with excessive drive force for several hours, until the extra tension in the end of the spring was relieved. This made the balance wheel rotate too far in each direction, causing the impulse pin on the wheel to knock against the back of the fork horns. This caused the watch to gain time, and could break the impulse pin. In older watches this was prevented with 'stopwork'. In modern watches this is prevented by designing the 'click' with some 'recoil' (backlash), to allow the arbor to rotate backward after winding by about two ratchet teeth, enough to remove excess tension.

=== Motor or safety barrel ===
Around 1900, when broken watchsprings were more of a problem, some pocketwatches used a variation of the going barrel called the motor barrel or safety barrel. Mainsprings usually broke at their attachment to the arbor, where bending stresses are greatest. When the mainspring broke, the outer part recoiled and the momentum spun the barrel in the reverse direction. This applied great force to the delicate wheel train and escapement, often breaking pivots and jewels.

In the motor barrel, the functions of the arbor and barrel were reversed from the going barrel. The mainspring was wound by the barrel, and turned the arbor to drive the wheel train. Thus if the mainspring broke, the destructive recoil of the barrel would be applied not to the wheel train but to the winding mechanism, which was robust enough to take it.

=== Safety pinion ===
A safety pinion was an alternate means of protection, used with the going barrel. In this, the center wheel pinion, which the barrel gear engages, was attached to its shaft with a reverse screw thread. If the spring broke, the reverse recoil of the barrel, instead of being passed on to the gear train, would simply unscrew the pinion.

== The myth of 'overwinding' ==
Watches and clocks are often found stopped with the mainspring fully wound, which led to a myth that winding a spring-driven timepiece all the way up damages it. Several problems can cause this type of breakdown, but it is never due to "overwinding", as timepieces are designed to handle being wound up all the way.

One cause of “overwinding” is dirt. Watch movements require regular cleaning and lubrication, and the normal result of neglecting to get a watch cleaned is a watch stopped at full wind. As the watch movement collects dirt and the oil dries up, friction increases, so that the mainspring doesn't have the force to turn the watch at the end of its normal running period, and it stops prematurely. If the owner continues to wind and use the watch without servicing, eventually the friction force reaches the 'flat' part of the torque curve, and quickly a point is reached where the mainspring doesn't have the force to run the watch even at full wind, so the watch stops with the mainspring fully wound. The watch needs service, but the problem is caused by a dirty movement or other defect, not "overwinding".

Another common cause of a watch stopped at full wind is that if a watch is dropped then the balance staff can break and the watch can no longer run even when the mainspring is fully wound.

== Self-winding watches and 'unbreakable' mainsprings ==
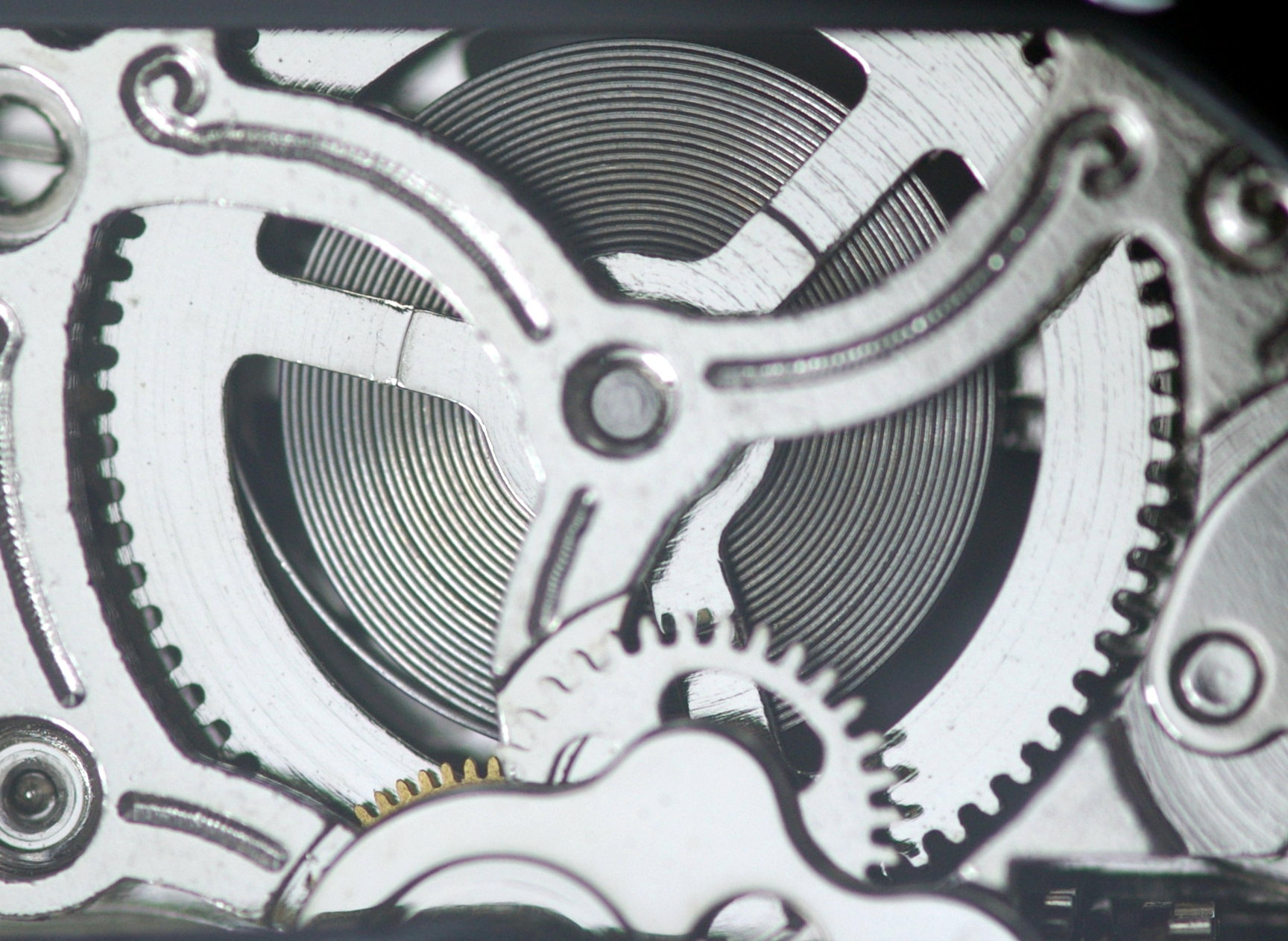
The mainspring of an automatic watch. The spring isn't firmly mounted on the left side, and will slip when fully wound.

Self-winding or automatic watches, introduced widely in the 1950s, use the natural motions of the wrist to keep the mainspring wound. A semicircular weight, pivoted at the center of the watch, rotates with each wrist motion. A winder mechanism uses rotations in both directions to wind the mainspring.

In automatic watches, motion of the wrist could continue winding the mainspring until it broke. This is prevented with a slipping clutch device. The outer end of the mainspring, instead of attaching to the barrel, is attached to a circular expansion spring called the bridle that presses against the inner wall of the barrel, which has serrations or notches to hold it. During normal winding the bridle holds by friction to the barrel, allowing the mainspring to wind. When the mainspring reaches its full tension, its pull is stronger than the bridle. Further rotation of the arbor causes the bridle to slip along the barrel, preventing further winding. In watch company terminology, this is often misleadingly referred to as an 'unbreakable mainspring'.

== 'Tired' or 'set' mainsprings ==
After decades of use, mainsprings in older timepieces are found to deform slightly and lose some of their force, becoming 'tired' or 'set'. This condition is mostly found in springs in barrels. It causes the running time between windings to decrease. During servicing the mainspring should be checked for 'tiredness' and replaced if necessary. The British Horological Institute suggests these tests:

- In a mainspring barrel, when unwound and relaxed, most of a healthy spring's turns should be pressed flat against the wall of the barrel, with only 1 or 2 turns spiralling across the central space to attach to the arbor. If more than 2 turns are loose in the center, the spring may be 'tired'; with 4 or 5 turns it definitely is 'tired'.
- When removed from the barrel, if the diameter of the relaxed spring lying on a flat surface is less than 2½ times the barrel diameter, it is 'tired'.

== Power reserve indicator ==
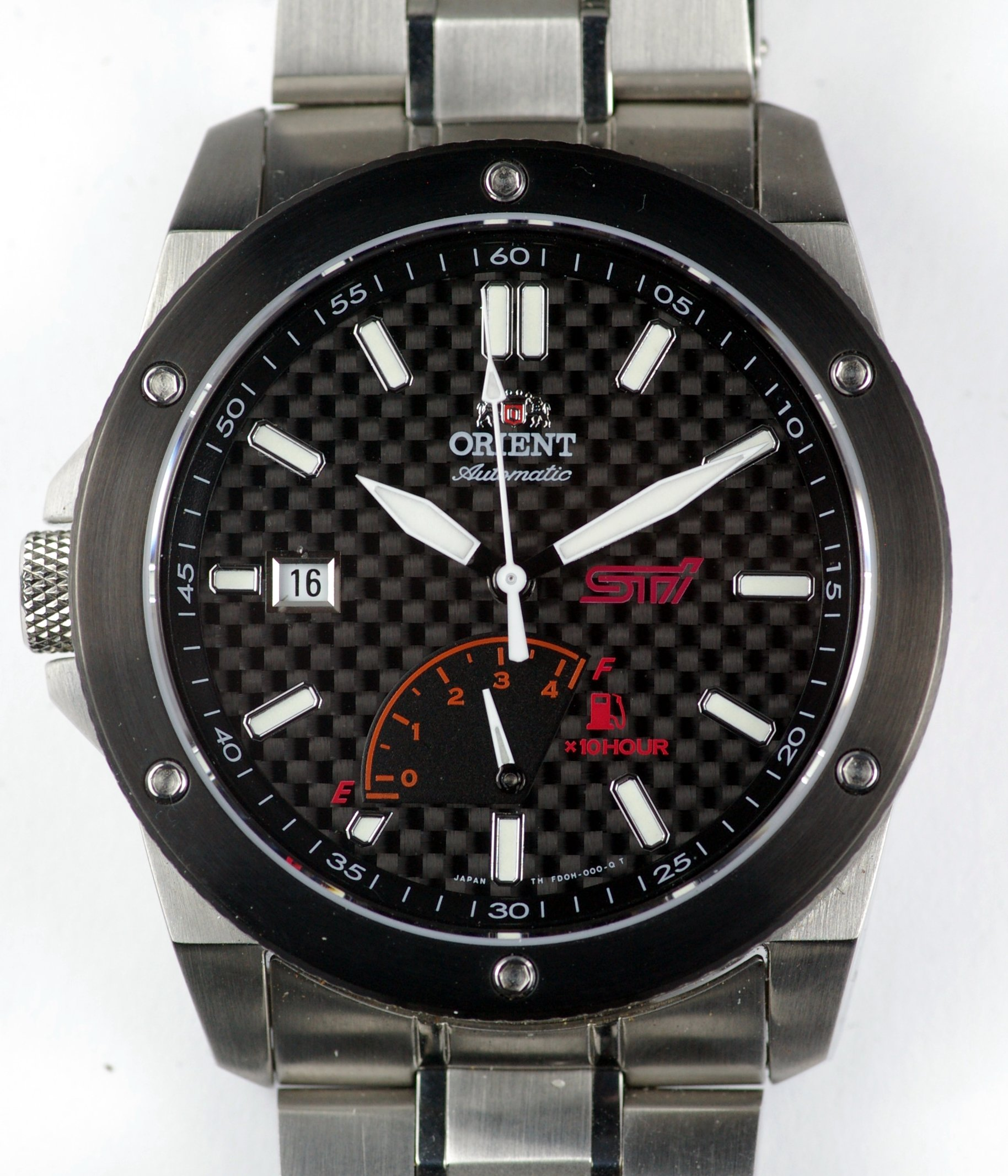
The power reserve indicator is at the 6 o'clock position on this automatic watch. Here it is indicating that 25 out of 40 hours remain

Some high-grade watches have an extra dial on the face indicating how much power is left in the mainspring, often graduated in hours the watch has left to run. Since both the arbor and the barrel turn, this mechanism requires a differential gear that measures how far the arbor has been turned, compared to the barrel.

== Unusual forms of mainspring ==
A mainspring is usually a coiled metal spring, however there are exceptions:

- The wagon spring clock: During a brief time in American clockmaking history, coilable spring steel was not available in the United States, and inventive clockmakers built clocks powered by a stack of leaf springs, similar to what has traditionally served as a suspension spring for wagons.
- Other spring types are conceivable and have been used occasionally on experimental timepieces.
- Occasionally one finds an odd clock with a spring made of material other than metal, such as synthetic elastic materials.
