= Skeleton watch =

Mechanical watch with moving parts visible

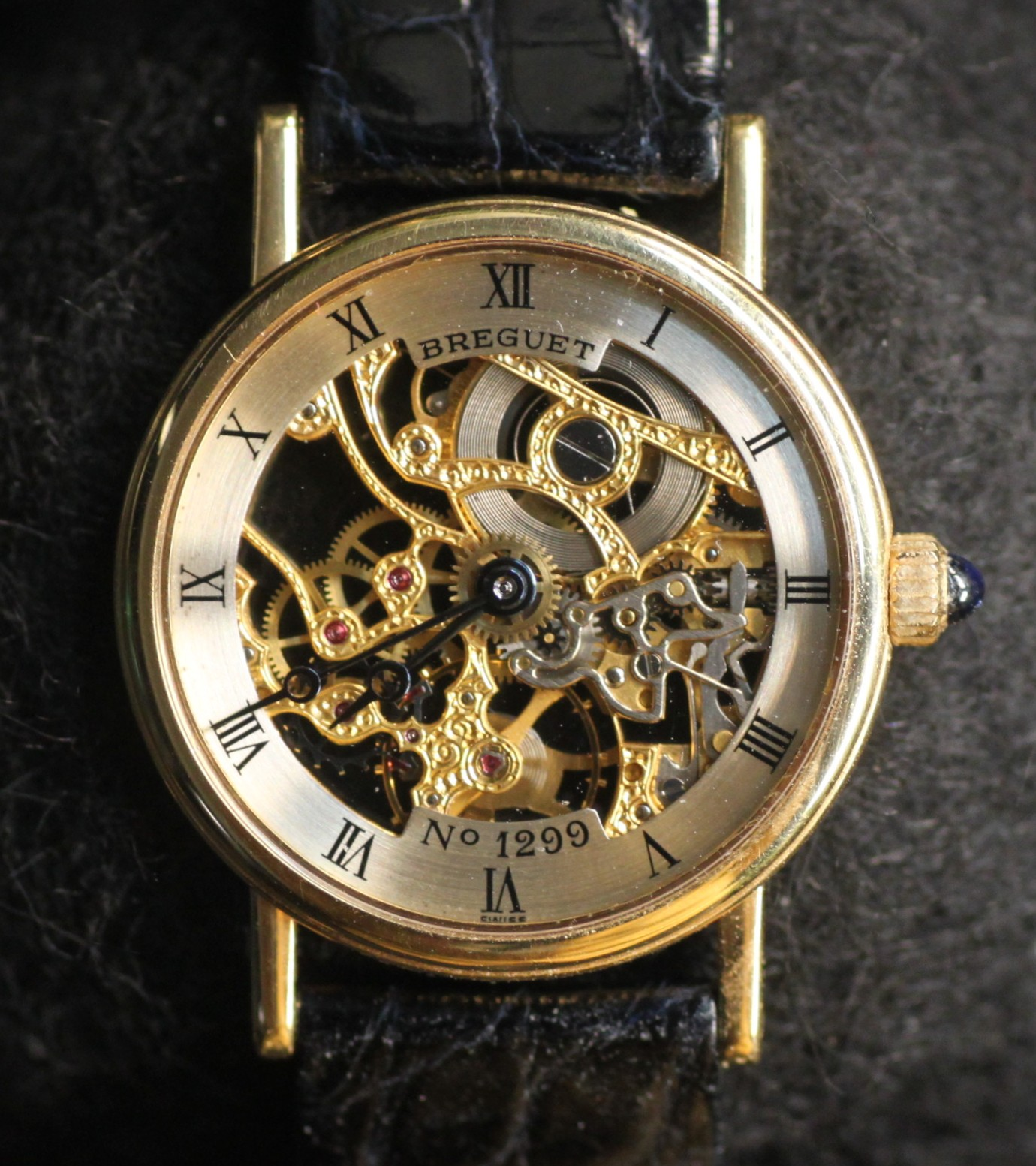
Bréguet

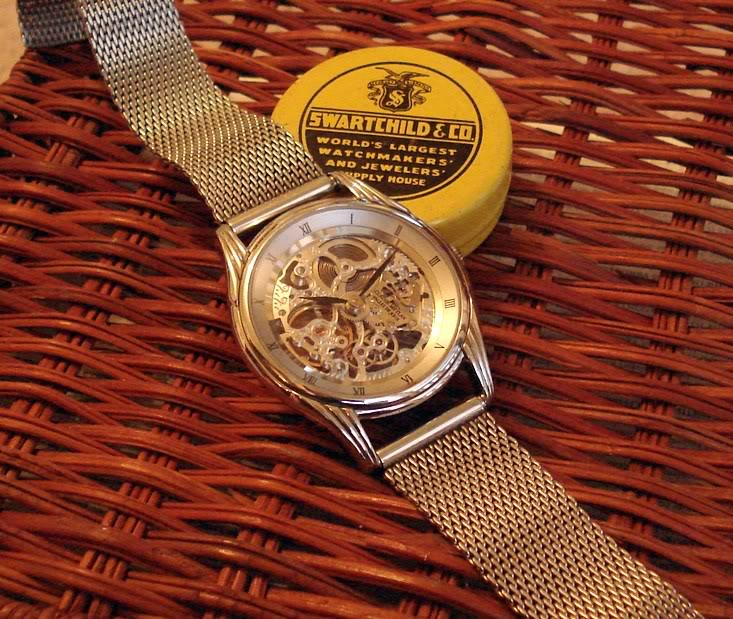
Claude Meylan skeleton

A skeleton watch is a mechanical watch in which the moving parts are visible. This may be through either the front of the watch, the back of the watch or a small cut outlining the dial.

True 'skeletonization' also includes the trimming away of any non-essential metal on the bridge, plate, wheel train or any other mechanical part of the watch, leaving only a minimalist 'bare' skeleton of the movement required for functionality. Often, the remaining thinned movement is decorated with engraving. This can be with or without a dial face that allows the user to see through to the movement.

Designs also providing a glimpse of the movement but requiring less modification to the movement itself are the “semi-skeleton” design, with a partial cutaway of the watch face to view the workings of the movement underneath, and the “open heart” design, with a (usually circular) window to view the oscillation of the balance wheel, the “beating heart” of the watch. The “open heart” design is especially common on watches with a tourbillon complication, the better to show off what is regarded as an example of watchmaking virtuosity.

Luxury skeleton watches often cost upwards of thousands of dollars, and some even reach into the hundreds of thousands.

== History ==
André-Charles Caron, a French clockmaker, created the skeleton watch in the 1760s. Patek Phillipe developed skeleton pocket watches for exhibition and display nearly a century later, in the mid-1800s. The same company began manufacturing skeleton pocket watches in the 1970s. Skeleton watches take a lot of time and effort to make, so very few were produced in the 18th and 19th centuries. Now, however, they are a popular luxury item of the 21st century.

== See also ==
- List of watch manufacturers
