= Barrel (horology) =

Part of the clockwork

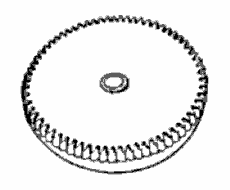
Watch going barrel

Used in mechanical watches and clocks, a barrel is a cylindrical metal box closed by a cover, with a ring of gear teeth around it, containing a spiral spring called the mainspring, which provides power to run the timepiece. The barrel turns on an arbor (axle). The spring is hooked to the barrel at its outer end and to the arbor at its inner end. The barrel teeth engage the first pinion of the wheel train of the watch, usually the center wheel. Barrels rotate slowly: for a watch mainspring barrel, the rate is usually one rotation every 8 hours. This construction allows the mainspring to be wound (by turning the arbour) without interrupting the tension of the spring driving the timepiece.

== Types ==
Plain barrel
I.e. without teeth, used in fusee watches and clocks. A chain, or cord, was wound around the plain barrel, connecting it to the fusee.
Going barrel
The form used in modern watches, is wound by turning the arbor and drives the watch movement by a ring of teeth around the barrel. This enables the mainspring to continue running the watch while it is being wound. Invented by Jean-Antoine Lépine.
Hanging barrel
A version of the going barrel that to save space is supported by the movement only at its upper end.
Motor, or safety, barrel
Used in pocket watches around 1900, a reverse variant of the going barrel in which the spring is wound by turning the barrel, and turns the watch movement by the central arbor. The purpose of this arrangement was that if the spring breaks, destructive recoil forces would not be applied to the vulnerable gear train.
