= Stackfreed =

Clockwork

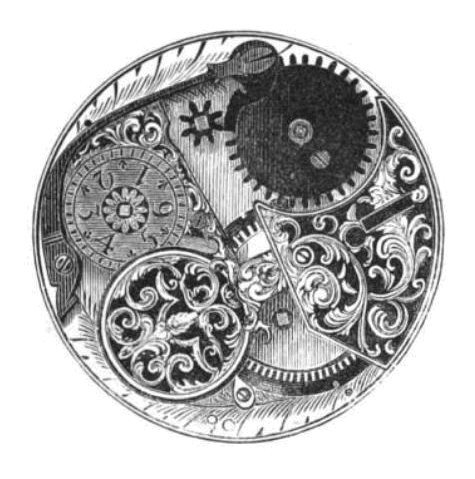
Back of 16th century pocketwatch movement, showing stackfreed (black cam and spring arm, top).

A stackfreed is a simple spring-loaded cam mechanism used in some of the earliest antique spring-driven clocks and watches to even out the force of the mainspring, to improve timekeeping accuracy. Stackfreeds were used in some German clocks and watches from the 16th to the 17th century, before they were replaced in later timepieces by the fusee. The term may have come from a compound of the German words starke ("strong") and feder ("spring").

== History ==
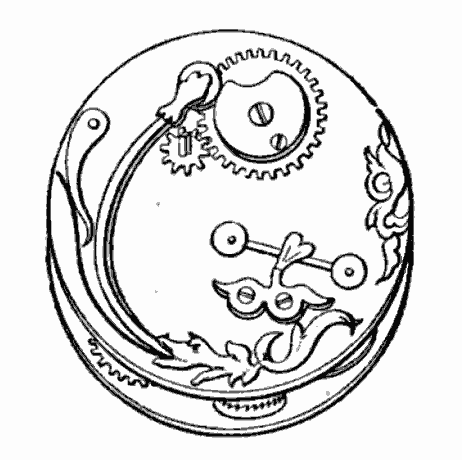
Drawing of 16th century watch with stackfreed

Spring-driven clocks were invented around 1400 in Europe. Mainsprings allowed clocks to be portable and smaller than the previous weight-driven clocks, evolving into the first large watches around 1500. However, the early spring-driven timepieces were much less accurate than weight-driven clocks, because they had a source of error weight-driven clocks didn't have. The drive force (torque) exerted by a coiled spring, unlike a weight, is not constant, but is maximum when the spring is wound up and declines as the spring unwinds to turn the movement's wheels. The main cause of inaccuracy in early spring-driven timepieces was the large variation in force provided by the mainspring as it unwound during the timepiece's running period. The force of the mainspring, transmitted through the clock's gears, gives pushes to the oscillating balance wheel which keeps time. The primitive verge and foliot movement used in all early timepieces was very sensitive to the amount of force applied to it, particularly before the balance spring was added in 1658; the weaker the drive force applied by the mainspring, the slower the balance wheel would oscillate back and forth. So without some device to equalize the force of the mainspring, early clocks and watches slowed down drastically during the clock's running period as the mainspring lost force, causing inaccurate timekeeping.

Two devices appeared in the first spring powered clocks to even out the power of the mainspring: the fusee and the stackfreed. The origin of the stackfreed is unknown. It is assumed it was invented in the southern Germanic states (Nuremberg and Augsburg) during the 16th century, since the early spring clocks which incorporated it came from there, but it may have been invented earlier. Drawings of stackfreeds appear in Leonardo da Vinci's Codex 1 (1492-1497) and M3 (1497-1499); possibly the device was brought to his attention by his German assistant Giulio. While the fusee went on to become the standard mainspring equalizer in European timepieces, the less satisfactory stackfreed was used exclusively in a few German timepieces; and disappeared after about a century. Surviving examples of stackfreed timepieces date from about 1530 to 1640.

== How it works ==
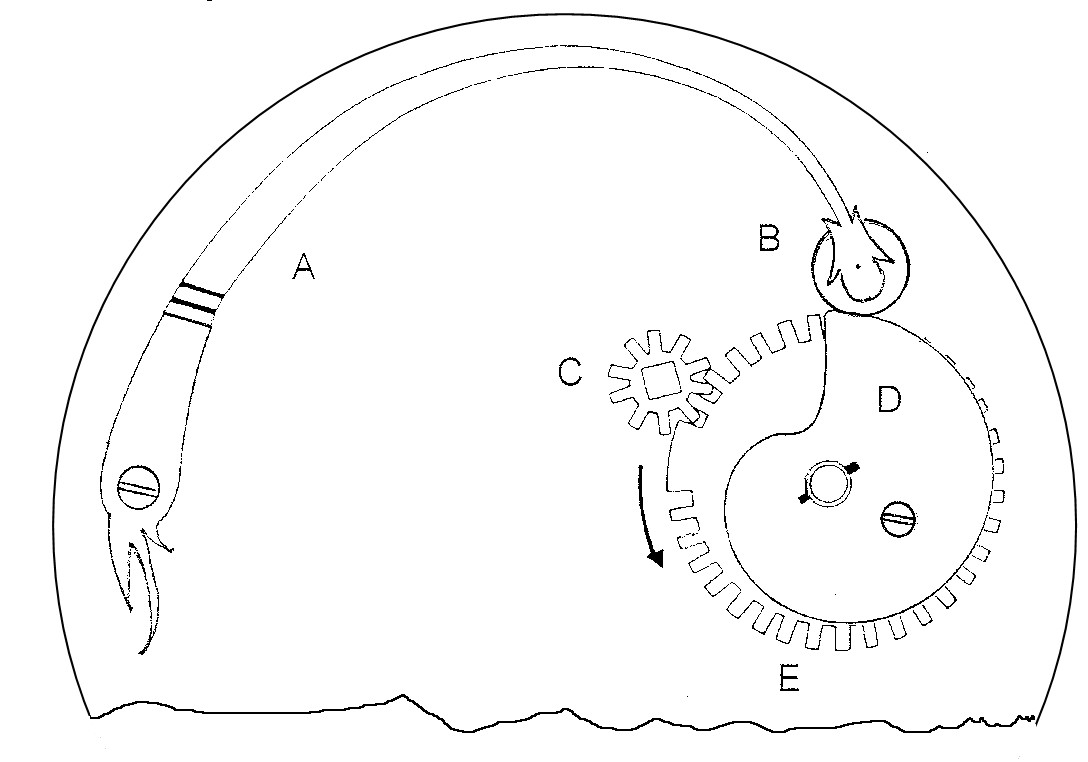
Stackfreed in a watch

See drawing. The stackfreed consists of a stiff spring arm (A) with a roller at the end (B) which presses against an eccentric cam (D); usually the roller rides in a groove in the cam's edge. The cam is shaped like a snail. It has a gear on it (E) that is turned by a gear on the mainspring arbor (C), so it makes one turn during the clock's running period. The force of the spring arm against the cam exerts a retarding force on the mainspring, reducing its torque, which varies with the thickness of the cam. When the mainspring is fully wound up, the arm presses against the wide part of the cam. Since it is far from the axis, the retarding force it exerts is maximum. As the clock runs and the mainspring unwinds, the cam rotates and the spring bears against the narrower parts of the cam, reducing the retarding force gradually, to compensate for the declining force of the mainspring.

Often (as shown in this drawing) a solid uncut section in the cam's (E) gear teeth also functioned as stopwork, limiting the mainspring so it stopped before it was wound up all the way, and stopped before it unwound all the way. This restricted the mainspring to the center part of its range, further reducing force variation.

== Advantages and disadvantages ==
The stackfreed was a very inefficient device. Since it worked by exerting an opposing friction force on the mainspring, it required more powerful mainsprings and higher gear ratios in watches, which may have introduced more variation in drive force. The fusee, the other mainspring compensation device, was much more efficient. The only advantages of the stackfreed were that it was easier to make and much thinner than the fusee, which, combined with the fact that it was located in unused space on the outside of the back plate, allowed stackfreed watches to be flatter. With the development of narrower, more compact fusees, the stackfreed disappeared from timepieces around 1630.

== See also ==
- History of watches
