= Tikkanen =

- Language: Finnish

Origin
- Meaning: "small woodpecker", derived from tikka ("woodpecker") and -nen ("small")
- Region of origin: Finland

Other names
- Variant form: Tikka

Tikkanen is a Finnish surname meaning "small woodpecker". Notable people with the surname include:

- Aino-Maija Tikkanen (1927–2014), Finnish film actress
- Esa Tikkanen (born 1965), retired Finnish professional ice hockey player
- Märta Tikkanen (born 1935), Finnish writer
- Päivi Tikkanen (born 1960), former long-distance runner from Finland
- Toivo Tikkanen (1888–1947), Finnish architect
- Hans Tikkanen (born 1985), Swedish chess Grandmaster
- Harri Tikkanen (born 1981), Finnish ice hockey defenceman
- Henrik Tikkanen (1924–1984), Finnish anti-war author
- Jouki Tikkanen (born 1995), Finnish rhythmic gymnast

== See also ==
- Tikkanen (horse)
