= Tikka (name) =

- Language: Finnish

Origin
- Meaning: "woodpecker", from tikka ("woodpecker")
- Region of origin: Finland

Other names
- Variant form: Tikkanen

Tikka is a surname originating in Finland (in Finnish, it means "woodpecker"). It has a variant, Tikkanen. Tikka is used as a surname in India and Pakistan. In the former, it is commonly found among Telugu people. In the latter it is also employed as a masculine given name.

Notable people with the name include:

== Surname ==
- Eeva Tikka (born 1939), Finnish writer
- Iqbal Tikka (died 2021), Pakistani politician
- Juha Tikka (1929–2001), Finnish swimmer
- Kari S. Tikka (1944–2006), Finnish legal scholar, professor of finance law
- Pertti Tikka (born 1955), Finnish ski-orienteer, world champion
- Pia Tikka (born 1961), Finnish film director and screenwriter
- Taneli Tikka (born 1978), Finnish entrepreneur in technology

== Given name ==
- Tikka Khan (1915–2002), Pakistani military general
