= Tom Machell =

British actor, writer and comedy performer (born 1990)

- Born: Newcastle upon Tyne
- Occupations: Actor, screenwriter & playwright
- Spouse: Holly Khan
- Children: 1
- Relatives: Charlie Machell (brother)

Thomas James Renwick Machell is a British actor, writer and comedy performer.

== Career ==
In 2013 Machell was cast in News Revue at The Canal Cafe Theatre whose alumni include Alistair McGowan, Reece Shearsmith, Bill Bailey & Sara Pascoe. After a successful run, he, along with his cast mates formed narrative sketch group zazU who went on to perform five sell out shows at Edinburgh Fringe and Soho Theatre. zazU was a character and narrative based comedy show built from a host of absurd inhabitants, alternative laws and epic goings on. The group won The Three Weeks Editors Choice award for Best Show in 2016.

In 2019 Machell wrote and starred in his debut play Ticker after losing a high school friend to an undiagnosed heart condition. The play was published by Playdead Press achieving critical acclaim.

In 2019 Machell played Robert in the London revival of David Greig's play Outlying Islands the production was nominated for the Offie for Best Production.

In 2020, Machell won the Uk Film Festival Best Short Script for 'A Spoonful'

Television and film acting credits for Machell include Vera, Hullraisers, The Emily Atack Show, Doctors and Emmerdale. He was part of the modern cast of BBC Radio 4's revival of Our Friends in The North.

In 2024, it was announced that Machell will write and star in a four part sitcom 'Tom and Lauren are going OOT' for BBC Radio 4 alongside fellow Geordie Lauren Pattison. The series also guest stars Julian Clarey and Louise Young. In August 2025 it was announced that Radio 4 commissioned a second series.

Machell alongside Co-writer Pattison were nominated for the North East Culture Awards 2025 for Best Writer for Series 1 of Tom and Lauren are Going OOT. Machell was shortlisted for Best Comedy Performance of the Year at the BBC Audio Drama Awards 2026.

In November 2026, Machell won The Enderby Entertainment Fellowship Filmmaking Award at The Austin Film Festival for his short film Sole Heirs that he co-wrote and stars in.
