= Tikka =

Tikka may refer to:

- Tikka (food), a type of South Asian food
- Tikka (forehead mark), a mark made on the forehead by Hindus
- Tikka (name), list of people with the name
- Tikka (brand), a brand of hunting rifles manufactured formerly by Finnish firearms manufacturer Tikkakoski
  - Tikka, the brand then owned by SAKO
- Tikka, a brand of headlamps by Petzl

== See also ==
- Ticker (disambiguation)
