= Manufacture Royale =

Swiss luxury watch brand

- Type: Privately held company
- Industry: Watchmaking
- Founded: 1770
- Founder: Voltaire
- Headquarters: Vallorbe, Switzerland
- Products: Wristwatches
- Website: www.manufacture-royale.com

Manufacture Royale is a Swiss luxury watch brand. Founded in the eighteenth century, the brand was revived in 2010.

== History ==
In 1770, philosopher Voltaire supports the establishment of watchmaking workshops in Ferney-Voltaire near Geneva and Manufacture Royale is established. It is then an important producer of timepieces and the famous Jean-Antoine Lépine, clockmaker to the king, is one of its watchmakers. Manufacture Royale also made objets d'art such as table watches. The Manufacture gently disappeared in the vicissitude of time but was revived in 2010. Manufacture Royale was bought by the Gouten family in 2013 and Alexis Gouten took over the management

== Watches ==
Modern watches of the brand are complicated Haute Horlogerie, manufactured in-house. The first models were tourbillon watches and a minute repeater. It was followed by the Androgyne, 1770 and voltige collections. The brand has been manage by Alexis Gouten.

== See also ==
List of watch manufacturers
