= Ticker (play) =

British play about sudden death

- Original language: English
- Written by: Tom Machell
- Music by: Holly Khan
- Characters: Spencer
- Genre: Dark Comedy

Premiere
- Date: August 2019
- Directed by: Derek Anderson

Ticker is a one person play written and performed by Tom Machell. In May 2019, it previewed at various London Theatre venues including Theatre 503 and The Bunker Theatre before heading to the Edinburgh Fringe Festival. The play premiered in August at Underbelly, Cowgate. In November 2019, the production transferred to Alphabetti Theatre in Newcastle upon Tyne and in 2021 to The Turbine Theatre at Battersea Power Station. The play was printed by PlayDead Press and Produced By Fight In The Dog in association with United Agents.

The play was directed and developed by Derek Anderson with original compositions and sound design by Holly Khan.

== Plot ==
Ticker follows twenty-something Spencer, a Geordie millennial who is deeply in love with Gabi. But Spencer's life is torn apart by Gabi's untimely—and unexplained—death. How can he even begin to cope with finding himself suddenly a prime suspect and a chief mourner? Themes of outsider grief and loneliness meet black-humour and frank dialogue, exploring male identity, toxic aggression, and how not talking about things can eventually lead to self-destruction.

== Reception and coverage ==
The play received a number of five-star reviews, with Narc magazine describing it as "dark themes of death, grief and loneliness are paired with satirical, playful black humour; expect sharp and witty dialogue delivered with emotion and vulnerability and executed in what is sure to be a stand out lead performance from Tom Machell."

The Scottish Sunday Post posted an article about the play and the impact it had on getting young people to get their hearts tested.

The play partnered with Cardiac Risk In The Young to raise awareness and funds for the charity.

The play was dedicated to Machell's friend Stephanie Mclean who died of a heart condition aged 24.
