= Mechanical watch =

Type of watch which uses a clockwork mechanism to measure the passage of time

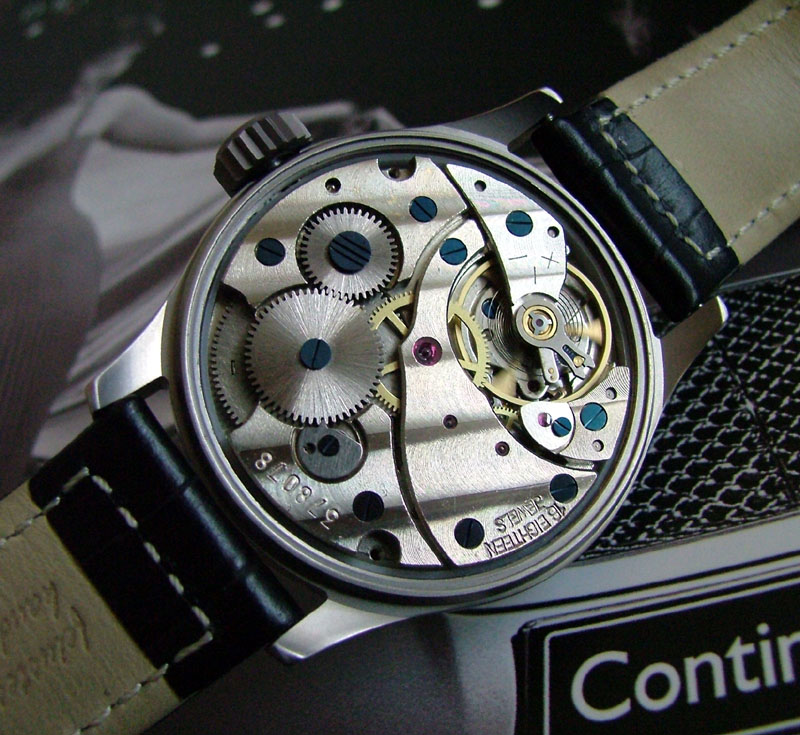
The hand-winding movement of a Russian watch

A mechanical watch is a watch that uses a clockwork mechanism to measure the passage of time, as opposed to quartz watches which function using the vibration modes of a piezoelectric quartz tuning fork. A mechanical watch is driven by a mainspring which must be wound either periodically by hand or via a self-winding mechanism. Its force is transmitted through a series of gears to power the balance wheel, a weighted wheel which oscillates back and forth at a constant rate. A device called an escapement releases the watch's wheels to move forward a small amount with each swing of the balance wheel, moving the watch's hands forward at a constant rate. The escapement is what makes the 'ticking' sound which is heard in an operating mechanical watch. Mechanical watches evolved in Europe in the 17th century from spring powered clocks, which appeared in the 15th century.

Mechanical watches are typically not as accurate as quartz watches, and they eventually require periodic cleaning, lubrication and calibration by a skilled watchmaker. Since the 1970s and 1980s, as a result of the quartz crisis, quartz watches have taken over most of the watch market, and mechanical watches (especially Swiss-made watches) are now mostly marketed as luxury goods, purchased for their aesthetic and luxury values, for appreciation of their fine craftsmanship, or as a status symbol.

== Components ==
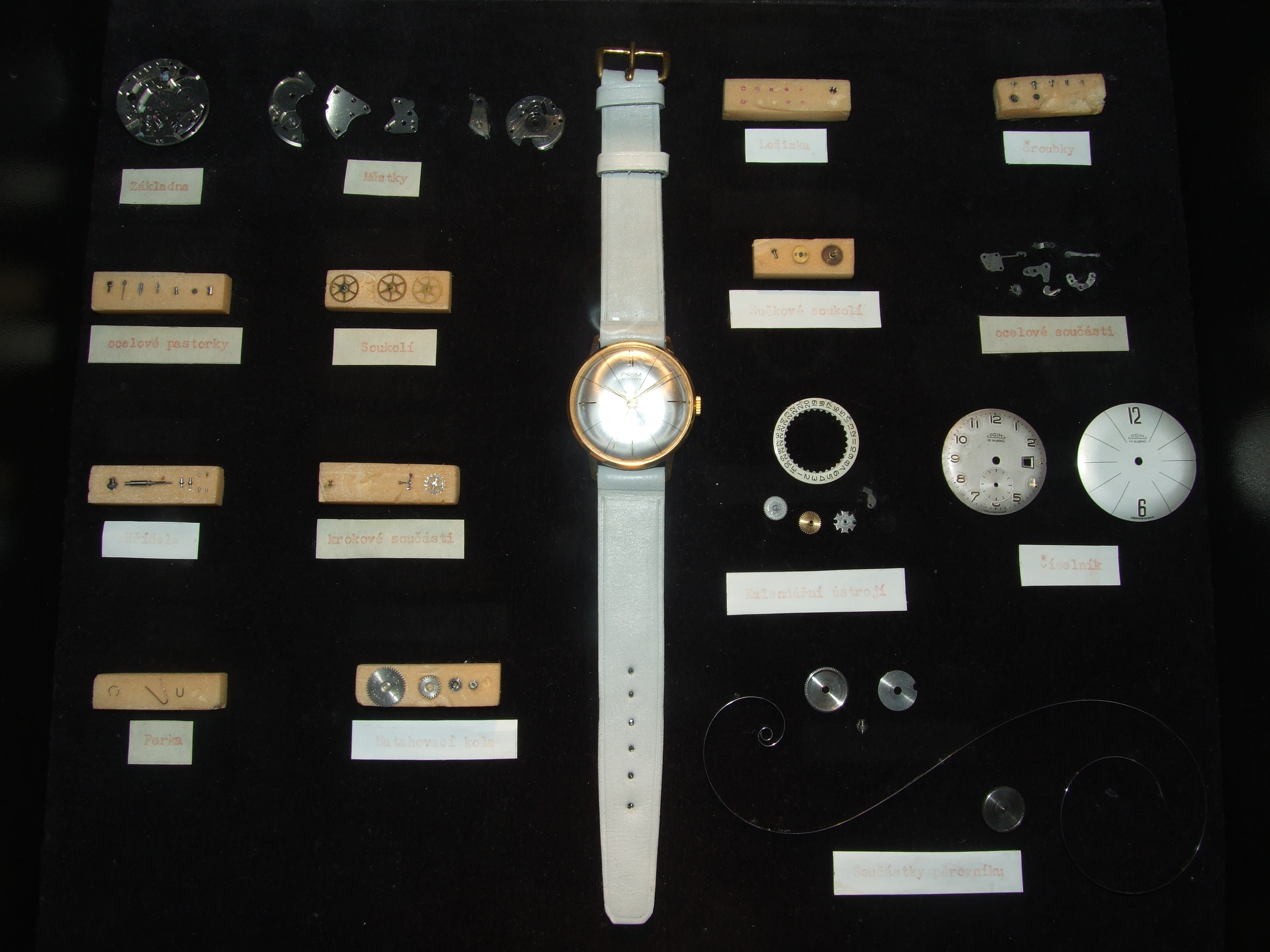
Mechanical wrist watch disassembled

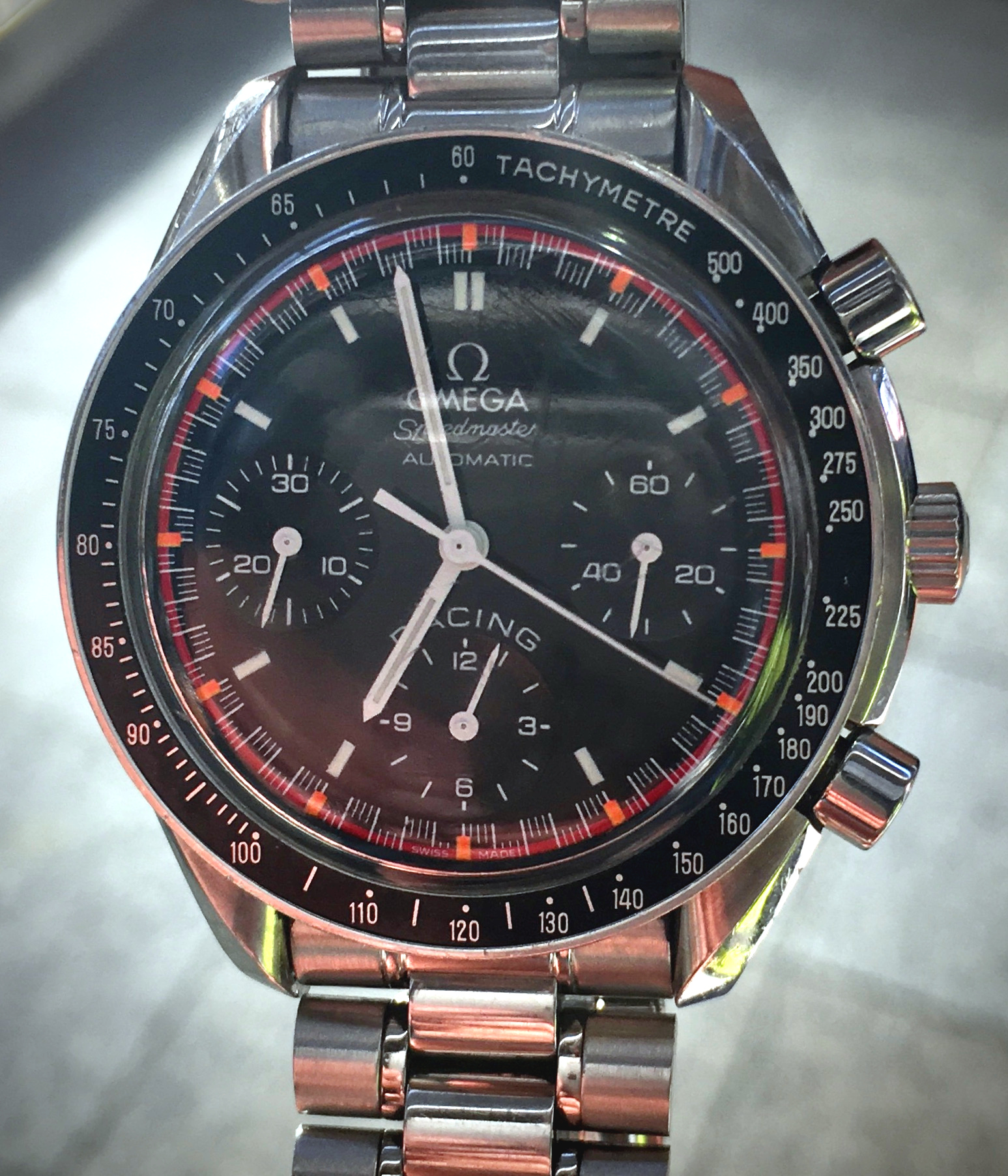
A chronograph watch, with stopwatch functions

The internal mechanism of a watch, excluding the face and hands, is called the movement. All mechanical watches have these five parts:

- A mainspring, which stores mechanical energy to power the watch.
- A gear train, called the wheel train, which has the dual function of transmitting the force of the mainspring to the balance wheel and adding up the swings of the balance wheel to get units of seconds, minutes, and hours. A separate part of the gear train, called the keyless work, allows the user to wind the mainspring and enables the hands to be moved to set the time.
- A balance wheel, which oscillates back and forth. This is the timekeeping element in the watch. Its timekeeping accuracy is due to the fact that it is a harmonic oscillator, with a period of oscillation which is very constant, dependent on the inertia of the wheel and the elasticity of the balance spring.
- An escapement mechanism, which has the dual function of keeping the balance wheel vibrating by giving it a push with each swing, and allowing the watch's gears to advance or 'escape' by a set amount with each swing. The periodic stopping of the gear train by the escapement makes the 'ticking' sound of the mechanical watch.
- An indicating dial, usually a traditional clock face with rotating hands, to display the time in human-readable form.

Additional functions on a watch besides the basic timekeeping ones are traditionally called complications. Mechanical watches may have these complications:

- Automatic winding or self-winding—in order to eliminate the need to wind the watch, this device winds the watch's mainspring automatically using the natural motions of the wrist, with a rotating-weight mechanism.
- Calendar—displays the date, and often the weekday, month, and year. Simple calendar watches do not account for the different lengths of the months, requiring the user to reset the date five times a year, but perpetual calendar watches account for this, and even leap years. An annual calendar does not make the leap year adjustment, and treats February as a 30-day month, so the date must be reset on March 1 every year when it incorrectly says February 29 or 30.
- Alarm—a bell or buzzer that can be set to go on at a given time.
- Chronograph—a watch with additional stopwatch functions. Buttons on the case start and stop the second hand and reset it to zero, and usually several subdials display the elapsed time in larger units.
- Hacking feature—found on military watches, a mechanism that stops the second hand while the watch is being set. This enables watches to be synchronized to the precise second. This is now a very common feature on many watches.
- Moon phase dial—shows the phase of the moon with a moon face on a rotating disk.
- Wind indicator or power reserve indicator—mostly found on automatic watches, a subdial that shows how much power is left in the mainspring, usually in terms of hours left to run.
- Repeater—a watch that chimes the hours audibly at the press of a button. This rare complication was originally used before artificial lighting to check what time it was in the dark. These complex mechanisms are now only found as novelties in extremely expensive luxury watches.
- Tourbillon—the first version of the feature was originally designed to make pocket watch effectively more accurate, because pocket watches were mostly in a vertical position when they were inside the pocket, this created imbalances in the balance wheel's spiral. The gravitational bias causing inaccuracy. In most watches, for maximum precision, the escape wheel should always be in a horizontal position, because of this a tourbillon is a rotating cage with the balance wheel is mounted inside, so it will experience all positions equally. For wristwatches of limited use because the escape wheel will be found in different positions during use of the watch, but it still remains among the most virtuous demonstrations, in fact the mechanism is usually exposed on the face to show it off. There are multi-axis tourbillons that are more appropriate for wristwatches. The FHH (Fondation de la Haute Horlogerie) definition is: "Any function other than the indication of hours, minutes and seconds, regardless of whether the mechanism is hand-wound or self-winding, mechanical or electronic, and of movement height . The tourbillon is considered complication even if it do not fall within the generic definition." Its function is not to provide additional information, but to adjust the timekeeping even more precisely. It is an adjustment device that is not essentially necessary for the operation of the watch.

== Mechanism ==
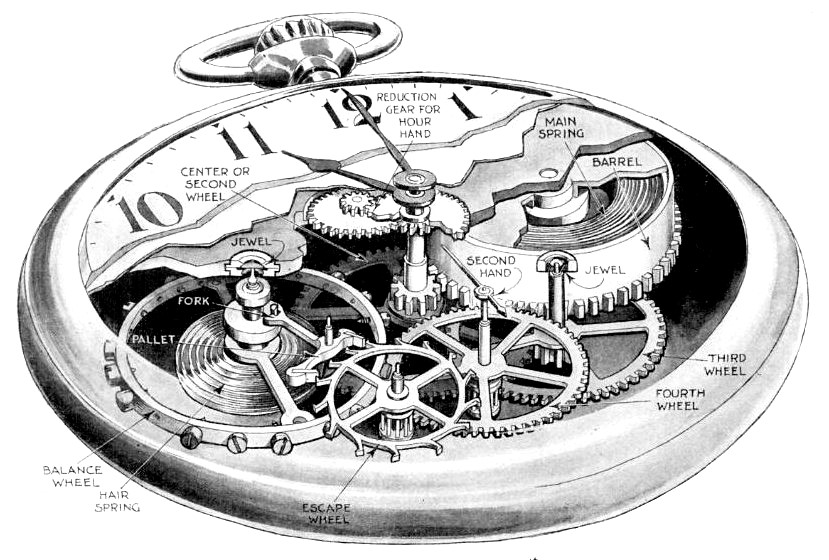
Cutaway drawing of pocketwatch, with parts labeled

The mechanical watch is a mature technology, with watch hands movements consists of similar parts and works the same way.

=== Mainspring and motion work ===
How a watch works (educational film from 1949)

The mainspring that powers the watch, a spiral ribbon of spring steel, is inside a cylindrical barrel, with the outer end of the mainspring attached to the barrel. The force of the mainspring turns the barrel. The barrel has gear teeth around the outside that turn the center wheel once per hour — this wheel has a shaft that goes through the dial. On the dial side the cannon pinion is attached with a friction fit (allowing it to slide when setting the hands) and the minute hand is attached to the cannon pinion. The cannon pinion drives a small 12-to-1 reduction gearing called the motion work that turns the hour wheel and hand once for every 12 revolutions of the minute hand.

For the same rate of oscillation, the duration of run, runtime or power reserve of a mechanical watch is mainly a question of what size of mainspring is used, which is, in turn, a question of how much power is needed and how much room is available. If the movement is dirty or worn, the power may not transfer from the mainspring efficiently to the escapement. Service can help restore a degraded runtime. Most mechanical watch movements have a duration of run between 36 and 72 hours. Some mechanical watch movements are able to run for a week. The exact duration of run for a mechanical movement is calculated with the formula
$n_2 = \frac{n_1 \cdot z_1}{z_2}$
where $z_1$ is the number of barrel teeth, $z_2$ is the number of center pinion leaves, $n_1$ is the number of revolutions of the barrel, and $n_2$ is the number of revolutions of the center pinion — the run duration.

=== Wheel train ===
The center wheel drives the pinion of the third wheel, and the third wheel drives the pinion of the fourth wheel. In watches with the seconds hand in a subsidiary seconds dial, usually located above the 6 o'clock position, the fourth wheel is geared to rotate once per minute, and the second hand is attached directly to the arbour of this wheel.

Animated watch movement. For clarity in this diagram the watch gears are arranged in a line, with the balance wheel on the left and the hands on separate wheels, rather than located concentrically as in an actual watch.

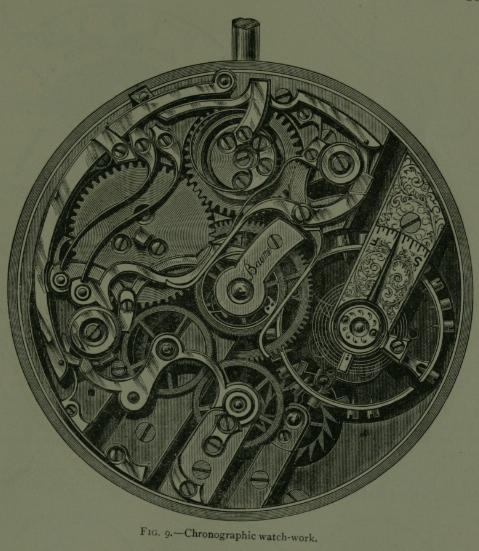
The movement of a chronograph pocketwatch from the 1880s

=== Escapement ===
The fourth wheel also drives the escape wheel of the lever escapement. The escape wheel teeth alternately catch on two fingers called pallets on the arms of the pallet lever, which rocks back and forth. The other end of the lever has a fork which engages with an upright impulse pin on the balance wheel shaft. Each time the balance wheel swings through its center position, it unlocks the lever, which releases one tooth of the escape wheel, allowing the watch's wheels to advance by a fixed amount, moving the hands forward. As the escape wheel turns, its tooth pushes against the lever, which gives the balance wheel a brief push, keeping it swinging back and forth.

=== Balance wheel ===
The balance wheel keeps time for the watch. It consists of a weighted wheel which rotates back and forth, which is returned toward its center position by a fine spiral spring, the balance spring or "hair spring". The wheel and spring together constitute a harmonic oscillator. The mass of the balance wheel combines with the stiffness of the spring to precisely control the period of each swing or 'beat' of the wheel. A balance wheel's period of oscillation T in seconds, the time required for one complete cycle (two beats), is

$$T = 2 \pi \sqrt{ \frac {I}{\kappa} } \,$$

where $I\,$ is the wheel's moment of inertia in kilogram-meter^{2} and $\kappa\,$ is the stiffness (spring constant) of its balance spring in newton-meters per radian. Most watch balance wheels oscillate at 5, 6, 8, or 10 beats per second. This translates into 2.5, 3, 4, and 5 Hz respectively, or 18000, 21,600, 28,800, and 36,000 beats per hour (BPH). In most watches there is a regulator lever on the balance spring which is used to adjust the rate of the watch. It has two curb pins which embrace the last turn of the spring, holding the part behind the pins motionless, so the position of the curb pins determines the length of the spring. Moving the regulator lever slides the curb pins up or down the spring to control its effective length. Sliding the pins up the spring, shortening the spring's length, makes it stiffer, increasing $\kappa\,$ in the equation above, decreasing the wheel's period $T\,$ so it swings back and forth faster, causing the watch to run faster.

=== Keyless work ===
A separate set of gears called the keyless work winds the mainspring when the crown is rotated, and when the crown is pulled out a short distance allow the hands to be turned to set the watch. The stem attached to the crown has a gear called the clutch or castle wheel, with two rings of teeth that project axially from the ends. When the stem is pushed in, the outer teeth turn the ratchet wheel on top of the mainspring barrel, which turns the shaft that the inner end of the mainspring is attached to, winding the mainspring tighter around the shaft. A spring-loaded pawl or click presses against the ratchet teeth, preventing the mainspring from unwinding. When the stem is pulled out, the inner teeth of the castle wheel engage with a gear which turns the minute wheel. When the crown is turned, the friction coupling of the cannon pinion allows the hands to be rotated.

=== Center seconds ===
If the seconds hand is co-axial with the minute and hour hand, that is it is pivoted at the center of the dial, this arrangement is called "center seconds" or "sweep seconds", because the seconds hand sweeps around the minute track on the dial.

Initially center seconds hands were driven off the third wheel, sometimes via an intermediate wheel, with the gearing on the outside of the top plate. This method of driving the seconds hand is called indirect center seconds. Because the gearing was outside the plates, it added to the thickness of the movement, and because the rotation of the third wheel had to be geared up to turn the seconds hand once a minute, the seconds hand had a fluttering motion.

In 1948 Zenith introduced a watch with a redesigned gear train where the fourth wheel was at the center of the movement, and so could drive a center seconds hand directly. The minute wheel, which had previously been at the center of the movement, was moved off center and drove the minute hand indirectly. Any fluttering due to the indirect gearing is concealed by the relatively slow movement of the minute hand. This redesign brought all the train gearing between the plates and allowed a thinner movement.

== Watch jewels ==
Jewel bearing and capstone used in balance wheel pivot

Ordinary 'hole jewel' bearing

Jewel bearings were invented and introduced in watches by Nicolas Fatio (or Facio) de Duillier and Pierre and Jacob Debaufre around 1702 to reduce friction. They did not become widely used until the mid-19th century. Until the 20th century they were ground from tiny pieces of natural gems. Watches often had garnet, quartz, or even glass jewels; only top quality watches used sapphire or ruby. In 1902, a process to grow artificial sapphire crystals was invented, making jewels much cheaper. Jewels in modern watches are all synthetic sapphire or (usually) ruby, made of corundum (Al_{2}O_{3}), one of the hardest substances known. The only difference between sapphire and ruby is that different impurities have been added to change the color; there is no difference in their properties as a bearing. The advantage of using jewels is that their ultrahard slick surface has a lower coefficient of friction with metal. The static coefficient of friction of steel-on-steel is 0.58, while that of sapphire-on-steel is 0.10-0.15.

=== Purposes ===
Jewels serve two purposes in a watch. First, reduced friction can increase accuracy. Friction in the wheel train bearings and the escapement causes slight variations in the impulses applied to the balance wheel, causing variations in the rate of timekeeping. The low, predictable friction of jewel surfaces reduces these variations. Second, they can increase the life of the bearings. In unjeweled bearings, the pivots of the watch's wheels rotate in holes in the plates supporting the movement. The sideways force applied by the driving gear causes more pressure and friction on one side of the hole. In some of the wheels, the rotating shaft can wear away the hole until it is oval shaped, eventually causing the gear to jam, stopping the watch.

=== Types ===
In the escapement, jewels are used for the parts that work by sliding friction:

- Pallets - These are the angled rectangular surfaces on the lever that are pushed against by the teeth of the escape wheel. They are the main source of friction in a watch movement, and were one of the first sites to which jewels were applied.
- Impulse pin - The off center pin on a disk on the balance staff which is pushed by the lever fork, to keep the balance wheel moving.

In bearings two different types are used:

- Hole jewels - These are donut shaped sleeve bearings used to support the arbor (shaft) of most wheels.
- Capstones or cap jewels - When the arbor of a wheel is in the vertical position, the shoulder of the arbor bears against the side of the hole jewel, increasing friction. This causes the rate of the watch to change when it is in different positions. So in bearings where friction is critical, such as the balance wheel pivots, flat capstones are added at each end of the arbor. When the arbor is in a vertical position, its rounded end bears against the surface of the capstone, lowering friction.

=== Where they are used ===
Where jewels are used in watches
7 jewel lever watch - has these jewels:
- 1 impulse pin
- 2 pallets
- 2 balance staff bearings
- 2 balance staff capstones
11 jewel watch - adds:
- 2 lever bearings
- 2 escape wheel bearings
15 jewel watch - adds:
- 2 fourth wheel bearings
- 2 third wheel bearings
17 jewel watch - adds:
- 2 center wheel bearings
21 jewel watch - adds:
- 2 lever capstones
- 2 escape wheel capstones
23 jewel watch - adds:
- 2 mainspring barrel bearings
Self winding watches add 4 or more

in the winding mechanism, for a total of 25-27

The number of jewels used in watch movements increased over the last 150 years as jeweling grew less expensive and watches grew more accurate. The only bearings that really need to be jeweled in a watch are the ones in the going train - the gear train that transmits force from the mainspring barrel to the balance wheel - since only they are constantly under force from the mainspring. The wheels that turn the hands (the motion work) and the calendar wheels are not under load, while the ones that wind the mainspring (the keyless work) are used very seldom, so they do not wear significantly. Friction has the greatest effect in the wheels that move the fastest, so they benefit most from jewelling. So the first mechanism to be jeweled in watches was the balance wheel pivots, followed by the escapement. As more jeweled bearings were added, they were applied to slower moving wheels, and jewelling progressed up the going train toward the barrel. A 17 jewel watch has every bearing from the balance wheel to the center wheel pivot bearings jeweled, so it was considered a 'fully jeweled' watch. In quality watches, to minimize positional error, capstones were added to the lever and escape wheel bearings, making 21 jewels. Even the mainspring barrel arbor was sometimes jeweled, making the total 23. When self-winding watches were introduced in the 1950s, several wheels in the automatic winding mechanism were jeweled, increasing the count to 25–27.

=== 'Jewel inflation' ===
It is doubtful whether adding jewels in addition to the ones listed above is really useful in a watch. It does not increase accuracy, since the only wheels which have an effect on the balance wheel, those in the going train, are already jeweled. Marine chronometers, the most accurate portable timepieces, often have only 7 jewels. Nor does jeweling additional wheel bearings increase the useful life of the movement; as mentioned above most of the other wheels do not get enough wear to need them.

However, by the early 20th century watch movements had been standardized to the point that there was little difference between their mechanisms, besides quality of workmanship. So watch manufacturers made the number of jewels, one of the few metrics differentiating quality watches, a major advertising point, listing it prominently on the watch's face. Consumers, with little else to go on, learned to equate more jewels with more quality in a watch. Although initially this was a good measure of quality, it gave manufacturers an incentive to increase the jewel count.

Around the 1960s this 'jewel craze' reached new heights, and manufacturers made watches with 41, 53, 75, or even 100 jewels. Most of these additional jewels were totally nonfunctional; they never contacted moving parts, and were included just to increase the jewel count. For example, the Waltham 100 jewel watch consisted of an ordinary 17 jewel movement, with 83 tiny pieces of ruby mounted around the automatic winding rotor.

In 1974, the International Organization for Standardization (ISO) in collaboration with the Swiss watch industry standards organization Normes de l'Industrie Horlogère Suisse (NIHS) published a standard, ISO 1112, which prohibited manufacturers from including such nonfunctional jewels in the jewel counts in advertising and sales literature. This stopped the use of totally nonfunctional jewels. However, some experts say manufacturers have continued to inflate the jewel count of their watches by 'upjeweling'; adding functional jeweled bearings to wheels that do not really need them, exploiting loopholes in ISO 1112. Examples given include adding capstones to third and fourth wheel bearings, jeweling minute wheel bearings, and automatic winding ratchet pawls. Arguably none of these additions adds to the accuracy or longevity of the watch.

== World time ==
Some fine mechanical watches will have a world time feature, which is a city bezel as well as an hour bezel which will rotate according to the city's relative time zone.

There are usually 27 cities (corresponding to 24 major time zones) on the city bezel, starting with GMT/UTC:

- UTC±00:00 - (United Kingdom) London
- UTC+01:00 - (Netherlands) Amsterdam
- UTC+01:00 - (Germany) Berlin
- UTC+01:00 - (Belgium) Brussels
- UTC+01:00 - (France) Paris
- UTC+02:00 - (Egypt) Cairo
- UTC+03:00 - (Russia) Moscow
- UTC+04:00 - (United Arab Emirates) Abu Dhabi/Dubai
- UTC+05:30 - (India) Kolkata
- UTC+06:00 - (Russia) Omsk Oblast
- UTC+07:00 - (Thailand) Bangkok
- UTC+08:00 - (Taiwan) Taipei / (China) Beijing / Hong Kong
- UTC+09:00 - (South Korea) Seoul / (Japan) Tokyo
- UTC+10:00 - (Australia) Sydney / (Australia) Melbourne
- UTC+11:00 - (France) Nouméa
- UTC+12:00 - (New Zealand) Auckland
- UTC+13:00 - Samoa
- UTC−10:00 - (United States) Honolulu
- UTC−09:00 - (United States) Anchorage
- UTC−08:00 - (United States) Los Angeles / (Canada) Vancouver
- UTC−07:00 - (United States) Denver
- UTC−06:00 - (United States) Chicago
- UTC−05:00 - (United States) New York City / (Canada) Toronto
- UTC−04:00 - (Venezuela) Caracas / (United States) Puerto Rico
- UTC−03:00 - (Argentina) Buenos Aires
- UTC−02:00 - (United Kingdom) South Georgia and the South Sandwich Islands
- UTC−01:00 - (Portugal) Azores

== History ==
Peter Henlein has often been described as the inventor of the first pocket watch, the "Nuremberg egg", in 1510, but this claim appears to be a 19th-century invention and does not appear in older sources.

Until the quartz revolution of the 1970s, all watches were mechanical. Early watches were terribly imprecise; a good one could vary as much as 15 minutes in a day. Modern precision (a few seconds per day) was not attained by any watch until 1760, when John Harrison created his marine chronometers. Industrialization of the movement manufacturing process by the Waltham Watch Company in 1854 made additional precision possible; the company won a gold medal at the 1876 Philadelphia Centennial Exposition for their manufacturing quality.

Mechanical watches are powered by a mainspring. Modern mechanical watches require of the order of 1 microwatt of power on average Because the mainspring provides an uneven source of power (its torque steadily decreases as the spring unwinds), watches from the early 16th century to the early 19th century featured a chain-driven fusee which served to regulate the torque output of the mainspring throughout its winding. Unfortunately, the fusees were very brittle, were very easy to break, and were the source of many problems, especially inaccuracy of timekeeping when the fusee chain became loose or lost its velocity after the lack of maintenance.

As new kinds of escapements were created which served to better isolate the watch from its time source, the balance spring, watches could be built without a fusee and still be accurate.

In the 18th century, the original verge escapement, which required a fusee, was gradually replaced in better French watches with the cylinder escapement, and in British watches with the duplex escapement. In the 19th century, both were superseded by the lever escapement which has been used almost exclusively ever since. A cheaper version of the lever, the pin lever escapement, patented in 1867 by Georges Frederic Roskopf was used in inexpensive watches until the 1970s.

As manual-wound mechanical watches became less popular and less favored in the 1970s, watch design and industrialists came out with the automatic watch. Whereas a mechanically-wound watch must be wound with the pendant or a levered setting, an automatic watch does not need to be wound by the pendant; simply rotating the watch winds the watch automatically. The interior of an automatic watch houses a swiveling metal or brass "plate" that swivels on its axis when the watch is shaken horizontally.

== See also ==
- Chronograph
- Jewel bearing
- Quartz watch
- Railroad chronometers
- Skeleton watch
- Tourbillon
- Marine chronometer
- ETA SA
- Lemania
