= Escapement =

Mechanism for regulating the speed of clocks

Animation of an anchor escapement, widely used in pendulum clocks

An escapement is a mechanical linkage in mechanical watches and clocks that gives impulses to the timekeeping element and periodically releases the gear train to move forward, advancing the clock's hands. The impulse action transfers energy to the clock's timekeeping element (usually a pendulum or balance wheel) to replace the energy lost to friction during its cycle and keep the timekeeper oscillating. The escapement is driven by force from a coiled spring or a suspended weight, transmitted through the timepiece's gear train. Each swing of the pendulum or balance wheel releases a tooth of the escapement's escape wheel, allowing the clock's gear train to advance or "escape" by a fixed amount. This regular periodic advancement moves the clock's hands forward at a steady rate. At the same time, the tooth gives the timekeeping element a push, before another tooth catches on the escapement's pallet, returning the escapement to its "locked" state. The sudden stopping of the escapement's tooth is what generates the characteristic "ticking" sound heard in operating mechanical clocks and watches.

The first mechanical escapement, the verge escapement, was invented in medieval Europe during the 13th century and was the crucial innovation that led to the development of the mechanical clock. The design of the escapement has a large effect on a timepiece's accuracy, and improvements in escapement design drove improvements in time measurement during the era of mechanical timekeeping from the 13th through the 19th century.

Escapements are also used in other mechanisms besides timepieces. Manual typewriters used escapements to step the carriage as each letter (or space) was typed.

== History ==
The invention of the escapement was an important step in the history of technology, as it made the all-mechanical clock possible. The first all-mechanical escapement, the verge escapement, was invented in 13th-century Europe. It allowed timekeeping methods to move from continuous processes such as the flow of water in water clocks, to repetitive oscillatory processes such as the swing of pendulums, enabling more accurate timekeeping. Oscillating timekeepers are the controlling devices in all modern clocks.

=== Liquid-driven escapements ===
The earliest liquid-driven escapement was described by the Greek engineer Philo of Byzantium in the 3rd century BC in chapter 31 of his technical treatise Pneumatics, as part of a washstand. A counterweighted spoon, supplied by a water tank, tips over in a basin when full, releasing a spherical piece of pumice in the process. Once the spoon has emptied, it is pulled up again by the counterweight, closing the door on the pumice by the tightening string. Remarkably, Philo's comment that "its construction is similar to that of clocks" indicates that such escapement mechanisms were already integrated in ancient water clocks.

In China, the Tang dynasty Buddhist monk Yi Xing, along with government official Liang Lingzan, made in 723 (or 725) AD the escapement for the workings of a water-powered armillary sphere and clock drive, which was the world's first clockwork escapement. Song dynasty horologists Zhang Sixun and Su Song duly applied escapement devices for their astronomical clock towers in the 10th century, where water flowed into a container on a pivot. However, the technology later stagnated and retrogressed. According to historian Derek J. de Solla Price, the Chinese escapement spread west and was the source of Western escapement technology.

According to Ahmad Y. Hassan, a mercury escapement described in a Spanish document for Alfonso X in 1277 can be traced to earlier Arabic sources. Knowledge of these mercury escapements may have spread through Europe with translations of Arabic and Spanish texts.

However, none of these were true mechanical escapements, since they still depended on the flow of liquid through a hole to measure time. In these designs, a container tipped over each time it filled up, thus advancing the clock's wheels each time an equal quantity of water was measured out. The time between releases depended on the rate of flow, as do all liquid clocks. The rate of flow of a liquid through a hole varies with temperature and viscosity changes and decreases with pressure as the level of liquid in the source container drops. The development of mechanical clocks depended on the invention of an escapement which would allow a clock's movement to be controlled by an oscillating weight, which would stay constant.

=== Mechanical escapements ===
The first mechanical escapement, the verge escapement, was used in a bell-ringing apparatus called an alarum for several centuries before it was adapted to clocks. Some sources claim that French architect Villard de Honnecourt invented the first escapement in 1237, citing a drawing of a rope linkage to turn a statue of an angel to follow the sun, found in his notebooks; however, the consensus is that this was not an escapement.

Astronomer Robertus Anglicus wrote in 1271 that clockmakers were trying to invent an escapement, but had not yet been successful. Records in financial transactions for the construction of clocks point to the late 13th century as the most likely date for when tower clock mechanisms transitioned from water clocks to mechanical escapements. Most sources agree that mechanical escapement clocks existed by 1300.

However, the earliest available description of an escapement was not a verge escapement, but a variation called a strob escapement. Described in Richard of Wallingford's 1327 manuscript Tractatus Horologii Astronomici on the clock that he built at the Abbey of St. Albans, this escapement consisted of a pair of escape wheels on the same axle, with alternating radial teeth. The verge rod was suspended between them, with a short crosspiece that rotated first in one direction and then the other as the staggered teeth pushed past. Although no other example is known, it is possible that this was the first clock escapement design.

The verge became the standard escapement used in all other early clocks and watches, and remained the only known escapement for 400 years. Its performance was limited by friction and recoil, but most importantly, the early balance wheels used in verge escapements, known as the foliot, lacked a balance spring and thus had no natural "beat", severely limiting their timekeeping accuracy.

A great leap in the accuracy of escapements happened after 1657, due to the invention of the pendulum and the addition of the balance spring to the balance wheel, which made the timekeepers in both clocks and watches harmonic oscillators. The resulting improvement in timekeeping accuracy enabled greater focus on the accuracy of the escapement. The next two centuries, the "golden age" of mechanical horology, saw the invention of over 300 escapement designs, although only about ten of these were ever widely used in clocks and watches.

The invention of the crystal oscillator and the quartz clock in the 1920s, which became the most accurate clock by the 1930s, shifted technological research in timekeeping to electronic methods, and escapement design ceased to play a role in advancing timekeeping precision.

== Reliability ==
The reliability of an escapement depends on the quality of workmanship and the level of maintenance given. A poorly constructed or poorly maintained escapement will cause problems. The escapement must accurately convert the oscillations of the pendulum or balance wheel into rotation of the clock or watch gear train, and it must deliver enough energy to the pendulum or balance wheel to maintain its oscillation.

In many escapements, the unlocking of the escapement involves sliding motion; for example, in the animation shown above, the pallets of the anchor slide against the escapement wheel teeth as the pendulum swings. The pallets are often made of very hard materials such as polished stone (for example, artificial ruby), but even so, they normally require lubrication. Since lubricating oil degrades over time due to evaporation, dust, and oxidation, periodic re-lubrication is needed. If this is not done, the timepiece may work unreliably or stop altogether, and the escapement components may be subjected to rapid wear. The increased reliability of modern watches is due primarily to the higher-quality oils used for lubrication. Lubricant lifetimes can be greater than five years in a high-quality watch.

Some escapements avoid sliding friction, such as the grasshopper escapement of John Harrison in the 18th century. These designs may avoid the need for lubrication in the escapement (though it does not obviate the requirement for lubrication of other parts of the gear train).

== Accuracy ==
The accuracy of a mechanical clock is dependent on the accuracy of the timing device. If this is a pendulum, then the pendulum's period of swing determines the accuracy. If the pendulum rod is made of metal, it will expand and contract with heat, lengthening or shortening the pendulum; this changes the time taken for a swing. Special alloys are used in expensive pendulum-based clocks to minimize this distortion. The degrees of arc in which a pendulum may swing varies; highly accurate pendulum-based clocks have very small arcs in order to minimize the circular error.

Pendulum-based clocks can achieve outstanding accuracy. Even into the 20th century, pendulum-based clocks were reference timepieces in laboratories.

Escapements play a big part in accuracy as well. The precise point in the pendulum's travel at which impulse is supplied will affect how closely to time the pendulum will swing. Ideally, the impulse should be evenly distributed on either side of the lowest point of the pendulum's swing. This is called "being in beat." This is because pushing a pendulum when it is moving towards mid-swing makes it gain, whereas pushing it while it is moving away from mid-swing makes it lose. If the impulse is evenly distributed then it gives energy to the pendulum without changing the time of its swing.

The pendulum's period depends slightly on the size of the swing. If the amplitude changes from 4° to 3°, the period of the pendulum will decrease by about 0.013 percent, which translates into a gain of about 12 seconds per day. This is caused by the restoring force on the pendulum being circular not linear; thus, the period of the pendulum is only approximately linear in the regime of the small angle approximation. To be time-independent, the path must be cycloidal. To minimize the effect with amplitude, pendulum swings are kept as small as possible.

As a rule, whatever the method of impulse, the action of the escapement should have the smallest effect on the oscillator that can be achieved. This effect, which all escapements have to a larger or smaller degree, is known as the escapement error.

Any escapement with sliding friction will need lubrication, but as this deteriorates the friction will increase, and, perhaps, insufficient power will be transferred to the timing device. If the timing device is a pendulum, the increased frictional forces will decrease the Q factor, increasing the resonance band, and decreasing its precision. For spring-driven clocks, the impulse force applied by the spring changes as the spring is unwound, following Hooke's law. For gravity-driven clocks, the impulse force also increases as the driving weight falls and more chain suspends the weight from the gear train; in practice, however, this effect is only seen in large public clocks, and it can be avoided by a closed-loop chain.

Watches and smaller clocks do not use pendulums as the timing device. Instead, they use a balance spring: a fine spring connected to a metal balance wheel that oscillates (rotates back and forth). Most modern mechanical watches have a working frequency of 3–4 Hz (oscillations per second) or 6–8 beats per second (21,600–28,800 beats per hour; bph). Faster or slower speeds are used in some watches (33,600 bph, or 19,800 bph). The working frequency depends on the balance spring's stiffness (spring constant); to keep time, the stiffness should not vary with temperature. Consequently, balance springs use sophisticated alloys; in this area, watchmaking is still advancing. As with the pendulum, the escapement must provide a small kick each cycle to keep the balance wheel oscillating. Also, the same lubrication problem occurs over time; the watch will lose accuracy (typically it will speed up) when the escapement lubrication starts to fail.

Pocket watches were the predecessor of modern wristwatches. Pocket watches, being in the pocket, were usually in a vertical orientation. Gravity causes some loss of accuracy as it magnifies over time any lack of symmetry in the weight of the balance. The tourbillon was invented to minimize this: the balance and spring are put in a cage that rotates (typically but not necessarily, once a minute), smoothing gravitational distortions. This very clever and sophisticated clockwork is a prized complication in wristwatches, even though the natural movement of the wearer tends to smooth gravitational influences anyway.

The most accurate commercially produced mechanical clock was the electromechanical Shortt-Synchronome free pendulum clock invented by W. H. Shortt in 1921, which had an uncertainty of about 1 second per year. The most accurate mechanical clock to date is probably the electromechanical Littlemore Clock, built by noted archaeologist E. T. Hall in the 1990s. In Hall's paper, he reports an uncertainty of 3 parts in 10^{9} measured over 100 days (an uncertainty of about 0.02 seconds over that period). Both of these clocks are electromechanical clocks: they use a pendulum as the timekeeping element, but electrical power rather than a mechanical gear train to supply energy to the pendulum.

== Theory of escapements ==
=== Resonance ===
The timekeeping element in mechanical clocks and watches, the pendulum or balance wheel, is in physics called a harmonic oscillator (resonator). It consists of a mass which is returned to its equilibrium position by a restoring force proportional to its displacement. Its advantage for timekeeping is that it oscillates preferentially at a specific resonant frequency $f$ or period independent of the width (amplitude) of swing, dependent only on its physical characteristics, and resists oscillating at other rates. The resonant frequency is determined by the moment of inertia of the resonator and the restoring force: in balance wheels the elasticity of the hairspring, in pendulums gravitational force.

=== Feedback oscillator ===
The escapement is a feedback control device, the drive force is triggered each time the resonator reaches a specific point in its cycle. The resonator (pendulum or balance wheel) and escapement together form a mechanical feedback oscillator, analogous to the electronic oscillator circuit in a quartz watch. It is driven by the continuous force (torque) of the timepiece's mainspring or weights, transmitted through the wheel train. The job of the escapement is to apply this force in short pushes (impulses) to the pendulum or balance wheel to maintain its oscillating motion, so it doesn't stop, with minimal disturbance to the period.

Escapements are challenging to understand because they are bidirectional devices: energy (impulses) to keep the oscillator going passes through the escapement from the wheel train to the oscillator, but timing signals, the locking and release of the escape wheel, which control how fast the wheel train and clock hands advance, pass in the opposite direction from the oscillator to the wheel train.

=== Q factor ===
The interaction of the escapement with the oscillator inevitably disturbs its natural swing, changing the period slightly. In precision clocks and watches this is often the major cause of inaccuracy. The escapement must interact with the oscillator to perform two functions each swing: when triggered at a certain point in the oscillator's swing it releases the clock's wheels to move forward a fixed amount, and applies an impulse force to the oscillator to replace the small amount of energy lost to friction each cycle.

How much error the escapement impulses cause depends on the oscillator's resonance curve. This curve is not infinitely "sharp". It has a small natural frequency range around its resonant frequency called the resonance width $W$. In operation the actual frequency of the oscillator can vary randomly within this range in response to variations in the impulse of the escapement, but outside this frequency range the oscillator does not work at all.

The measure of the possible accuracy of a harmonic oscillator as a timekeeper is a dimensionless parameter called the Q factor, which is equal to the resonant frequency $f$ divided by the resonance width

$$Q = {f \over W}$$

The larger the $Q$ factor, the smaller the resonance width as a fraction of the resonant frequency so the more precisely the oscillator regulates the rate of the timepiece.

The $Q$ factor depends on how much friction the oscillator has, how many swings it makes before it runs down when it is swinging freely. The less friction the higher the $Q$. The $Q$ is equal to 2π times the ratio of the stored energy in the pendulum or balance wheel to the energy lost to friction during each cycle, which is equal to the energy added by the escapement impulse each cycle. So the larger the $Q$ is, the smaller the energy loss, the smaller the impulse that has to be applied each cycle to keep it oscillating, and the smaller the disturbance to the oscillator's natural motion. The $Q$ of balance wheels is around 300, that of pendulums is 10^{3} - 10^{5}, while that of quartz crystals in quartz clocks is 10^{5} - 10^{6}. This explains why balance wheels are generally less accurate timekeepers than pendulums, which are less accurate than quartz clocks.

=== Isochronism ===
If the impulse applied by the escapement could be identical and applied at the identical point each cycle, the response of the oscillator would be identical and its period would be constant, and the escapement would not cause any inaccuracy. However this is not possible. There are unavoidable small variations in the drive force applied to the escapement in all timepieces, due to causes such as the mainspring running down, variations in lubrication viscosity with temperature, lubrication drying up, accumulation of dirt and corrosion, changes in friction due to wear, thermal expansion of parts with temperature changes, and "positional error" in watches: changing friction when the watch is turned and the weight of gear wheel arbors presses against bearing surfaces.

Therefore the goal of escapement design is to apply the impulse in a way that minimizes the change in period with changes in drive force. This is called isochronism. No escapement is completely isochronous, but the less a change in drive force disturbs the oscillator, the more accurate the timepiece can be.

Even if the escapement operation were perfectly isochronous, the pendulum or balance wheel itself inevitably has small inherent departures from isochronism, caused by failure of the restoring force to be exactly proportional to amplitude. In balance wheels this is due to small nonlinearities in the balance spring. In pendulums this is due to circular error, a small increase in the period of swing with amplitude.

=== The Airy condition ===
In 1826 George Biddell Airy showed that for maximum isochronism the best place in its cycle to apply the impulse to a harmonic oscillator is at its equilibrium position; in a pendulum at the bottom of its swing, and in a balance wheel as it passes through its center rest position, where the restoring force of the spring is zero. In contrast, applying an impulse force to the oscillator at the extremes of its swing causes maximum disturbance to its motion. Airy proved that, if driven by an impulse symmetrical about its equilibrium point, an ideal harmonic oscillator is isochronous; its period is independent of its drive force and amplitude of swing. The best escapements such as the deadbeat and the lever approximate this condition.

=== Detachment ===
Since the force of the escapement on the oscillator is the source of error in precision timepieces, in general the more the oscillator is left undisturbed to swing freely during its cycle by the escapement, the more accurate it can be. Escapements are classified by how much of the oscillator's cycle the escapement exerts force (impulse) on it:

- In "frictional" escapements, like the verge and anchor escapement, the escape wheel teeth are pushing on the oscillator throughout its cycle, by sliding friction on the pallets. This disturbs the oscillator, so these are less accurate.
- In "frictional-rest" escapements, like the duplex, cylinder, and deadbeat escapement, the oscillator is only impulsed during part of its cycle, but the escapement makes sliding frictional contact with the oscillator during the rest of the cycle. These can be more accurate, depending on the amount of friction.
- In "detached" escapements, such as the Riefler, lever and chronometer escapement, the escapement linkage does not contact the oscillator except during the impulse period in the center of its swing, so these are among the most accurate escapements.

A major source of inaccuracy is friction between the sliding parts of the escapement; the escape wheel tooth sliding as it pushes on the pallet. In precision timepieces the pallet surfaces are made of jewels, principally synthetic sapphire, whose ultrahard surfaces have only 10-20% of the coefficient of friction of metal on metal. The surfaces are lubricated to reduce friction further. In the most accurate escapements, such as the detent escapement, the duplex escapement, and the coaxial escapement, the escape wheel tooth moves almost parallel to the pallet during impulse, reducing the friction, and do not require lubrication.

== Mechanical escapements ==
Since 1658 when the introduction of the pendulum and balance spring made accurate timepieces possible, it has been estimated that more than three hundred different mechanical escapements have been devised, but only about 10 have seen widespread use. These are described below. In the 20th century, electric timekeeping methods replaced mechanical clocks and watches, so escapement design became a little-known curiosity.

=== Verge escapement ===
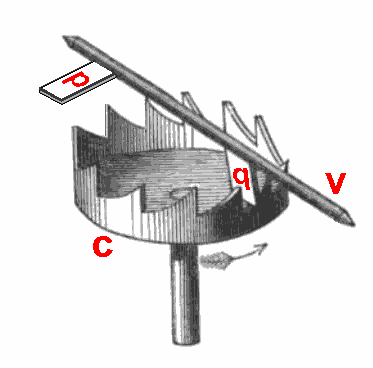
Verge escapement showing crown wheel (c), verge rod (v), and pallets (p, q). Orientation is shown for use with a pendulum. When used with a foliot, the wheel and rod are vertical.

Verge and foliot of De Vick clock, built 1379, Paris

Animation of a verge escapement

The earliest mechanical escapement, from the late 1200s, was the verge escapement, also known as the crown-wheel escapement. It was used in the first mechanical clocks and was originally controlled by a foliot, a horizontal bar with weights at either end. The escapement consists of an escape wheel shaped somewhat like a crown, with pointed teeth sticking axially out of the side, oriented horizontally. In front of the crown wheel is a vertical shaft, attached to the foliot at the top, which carries two metal plates (pallets) sticking out like flags from a flag pole, oriented about ninety degrees apart, so only one engages the crown wheel teeth at a time. As the wheel turns, one tooth pushes against the upper pallet, rotating the shaft and the attached foliot. As the tooth pushes past the upper pallet, the lower pallet swings into the path of the teeth on the other side of the wheel. A tooth catches on the lower pallet, rotating the shaft back the other way, and the cycle repeats. A disadvantage of the escapement was that each time a tooth landed on a pallet, the momentum of the foliot pushed the crown wheel backward a short distance before the force of the wheel reversed the motion. This is called recoil and was a source of wear and inaccuracy.

The verge was the only escapement used in clocks and watches for 350 years. In spring-driven clocks and watches, it required a fusee to even out the force of the mainspring. It was used in the first pendulum clocks for about 50 years after the pendulum clock was invented in 1656. In a pendulum clock, the crown wheel and staff were oriented horizontally, and the pendulum was hung from the staff. However, the verge is the most inaccurate of the common escapements, and after the pendulum was introduced in the 1650s, the verge began to be replaced by other escapements, being abandoned only by the late 1800s. By this time, the fashion for thin watches had required that the escape wheel be made very small, amplifying the effects of wear, and when a watch of this period is wound up today, it will often be found to run very fast, gaining many hours per day.

=== Cross-beat escapement ===
In 1584 Jost Bürgi invented the cross-beat escapement, a variation of the verge escapement that had two foliots that rotated in opposite directions. According to contemporary accounts, his clocks achieved remarkable accuracy of within a minute per day, two orders of magnitude better than other clocks of the time. However, this improvement was probably not due to the escapement itself, but rather to better workmanship and his invention of the remontoire, a device that isolated the escapement from changes in drive force. Without a balance spring, the cross-beat would have been no more isochronous than the verge.

=== Galileo's escapement ===
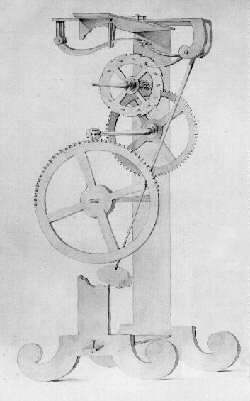
Original drawing (c. 1637) of Galileo's pendulum clock and escapement

Galileo's escapement is a design for a clock escapement, invented around 1637 by Italian scientist Galileo Galilei. It was the earliest design of a pendulum clock. Since he was blind by then, Galileo described the device to his son, who drew a sketch of it. The son began construction of a prototype, but both he and Galileo died before it was completed.

=== Anchor escapement ===
Animation of anchor escapement

Invented around 1657 by Robert Hooke, the anchor (see animation) quickly superseded the verge to become the standard escapement used in pendulum clocks through to the 19th century. Its advantage was that it reduced the wide pendulum swing angles of the verge to 3–6°, making the pendulum nearly isochronous, and allowing the use of longer, slower-moving pendulums, which used less energy. The anchor is responsible for the long narrow shape of most pendulum clocks, and for the development of the grandfather clock, the first anchor clock to be sold commercially, which was invented around 1680 by William Clement, who disputed credit for the escapement with Hooke.

The anchor consists of an escape wheel with pointed, backward slanted teeth, and a piece pivoted above it, shaped vaguely like a ship's anchor, which rocks from side to side, linked to the pendulum. The anchor has slanted pallets on the arms which alternately catch on the teeth of the escape wheel, receiving impulses. Operation is mechanically similar to the verge escapement, and it has two of the verge's disadvantages: (1) The pendulum is constantly being pushed by an escape wheel tooth throughout its cycle, and is never allowed to swing freely, which disturbs its isochronism, and (2) it is a recoil escapement; the anchor pushes the escape wheel backward during part of its cycle. This causes backlash, increased wear in the clock's gears, and inaccuracy. These problems were eliminated in the deadbeat escapement, which slowly replaced the anchor in precision clocks.

=== Deadbeat escapement ===
Deadbeat escapement diagram showing escape wheel (a), pallets (b), and pendulum crutch (c)

The Graham or deadbeat escapement was an improvement of the anchor escapement first made by Thomas Tompion to a design by Richard Towneley in 1675, although it is often credited to Tompion's successor George Graham who popularized it in 1715. In the anchor escapement the swing of the pendulum pushes the escape wheel backward during part of its cycle. This "recoil" disturbs the motion of the pendulum, causing inaccuracy, and reverses the direction of the gear train, causing backlash and introducing high loads into the system, leading to friction and wear. The main advantage of the deadbeat is that it eliminated recoil.

In the deadbeat, the pallets have a second curved "locking" face on them, concentric about the pivot on which the anchor turns. During the extremities of the pendulum's swing, the escape wheel tooth rests against this locking face, providing no impulse to the pendulum, which prevents recoil. Near the bottom of the pendulum's swing, the tooth slides off the locking face onto the angled "impulse" face, giving the pendulum a push, before the pallet releases the tooth. The deadbeat was first used in precision regulator clocks, but because of its greater accuracy it superseded the anchor in the 19th century. It is used in almost all modern pendulum clocks, except for tower clocks, which often use gravity escapements.

=== Pin wheel escapement ===
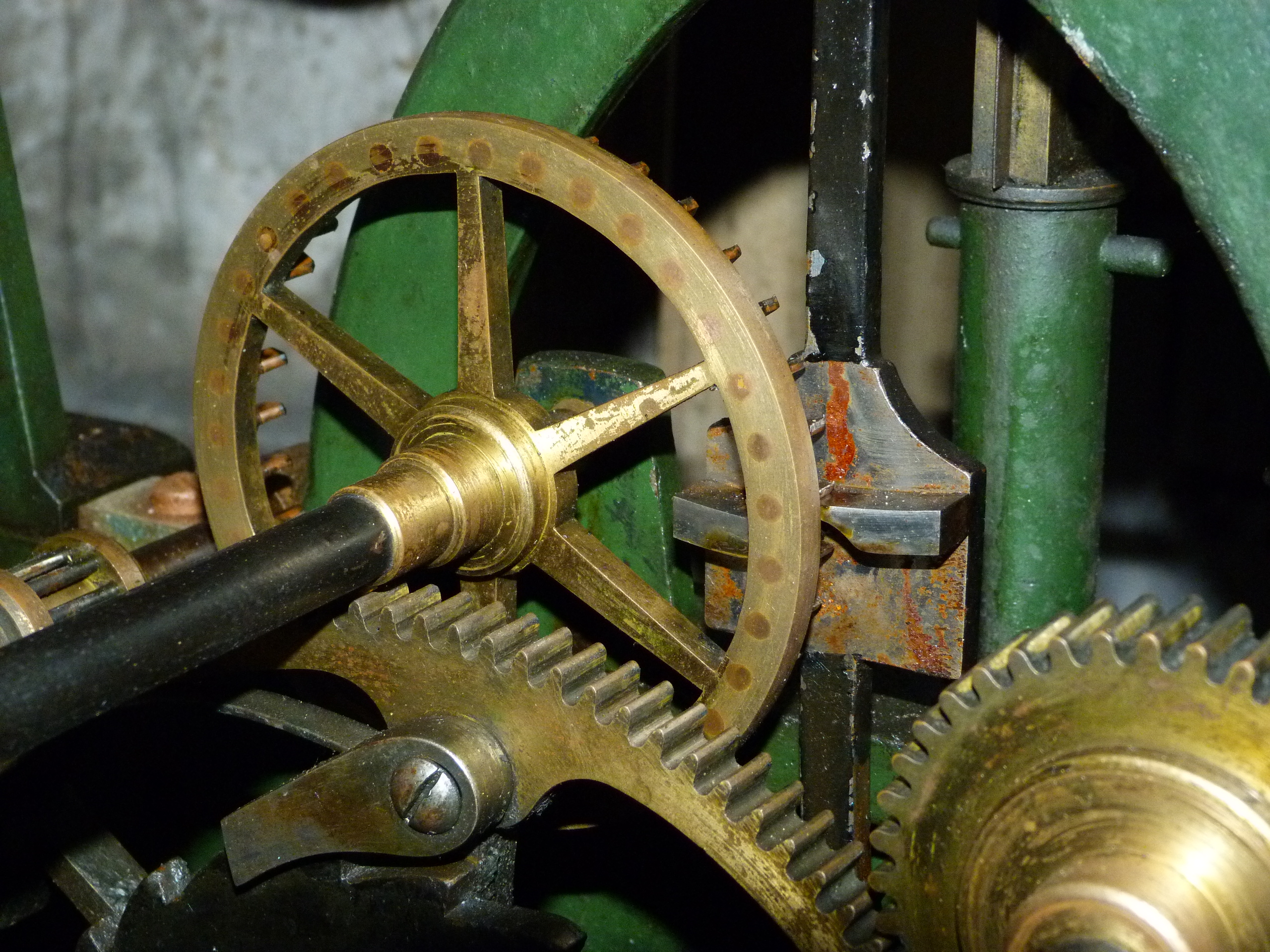
Pin wheel escapement of South Mymms tower clock

Invented around 1741 by Louis Amant, this version of a deadbeat escapement can be made quite rugged. Instead of using teeth, the escape wheel has round pins that are stopped and released by a scissors-like anchor. This escapement, which is also called the Amant escapement or (in Germany) the Mannhardt escapement, is used quite often in tower clocks.

=== Detent escapement ===
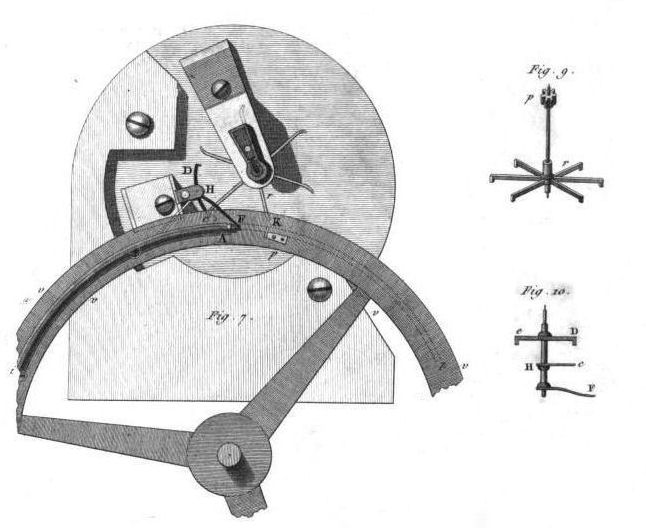
First detent escapement by Pierre Le Roy 1748

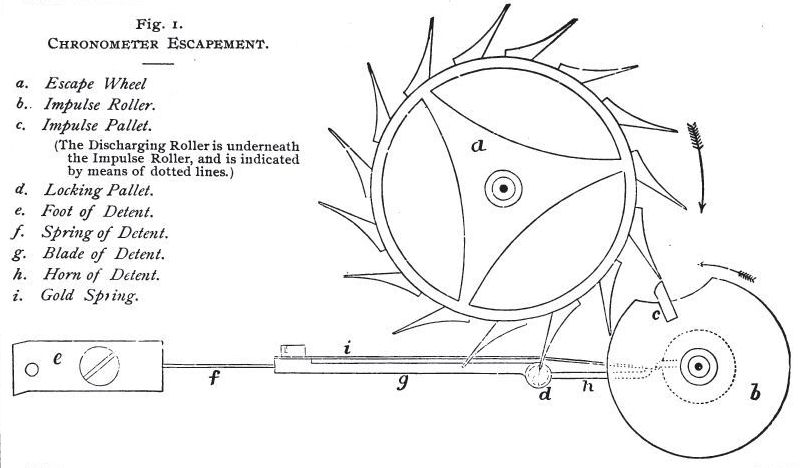
Earnshaw's detent escapement, used widely in chronometers

The detent or chronometer escapement was used in marine chronometers, although some precision watches during the 18th and 19th centuries also used it. It was considered the most accurate of the balance wheel escapements before the beginning of the 20th century, when lever escapement chronometers began to outperform them in competition. The early form was invented by Pierre Le Roy in 1748, who created a pivoted detent type of escapement, though this was theoretically deficient. The first effective design of detent escapement was invented by John Arnold around 1775, but with the detent pivoted. This escapement was modified by Thomas Earnshaw in 1780 and patented by Wright (for whom he worked) in 1783; however, as depicted in the patent it was unworkable. Arnold also designed a spring detent escapement but, with improved design, Earnshaw's version eventually prevailed as the basic idea underwent several minor modifications during the last decade of the 18th century. The final form appeared around 1800, and this design was used until mechanical chronometers became obsolete in the 1970s.

The detent is a detached escapement; it allows the balance wheel to swing undisturbed during most of its cycle, except the brief impulse period, which is only given once per cycle (every other swing). Because the driving escape wheel tooth moves almost parallel to the pallet, the escapement has little friction and does not need oiling. For these reasons among others, the detent was considered the most accurate escapement for balance wheel timepieces. John Arnold was the first to use the detent escapement with an overcoil balance spring (patented 1782), and with this improvement his watches were the first truly accurate pocket timekeepers, keeping time to within 1 or 2 seconds per day. These were produced from 1783 onwards.

However, the escapement had disadvantages that limited its use in watches: it was fragile and required skilled maintenance; it was not self-starting, so if the watch was jarred in use so the balance wheel stopped, it would not start up again; and it was harder to manufacture in volume. Therefore, the self-starting lever escapement became dominant in watches.

=== Cylinder escapement ===
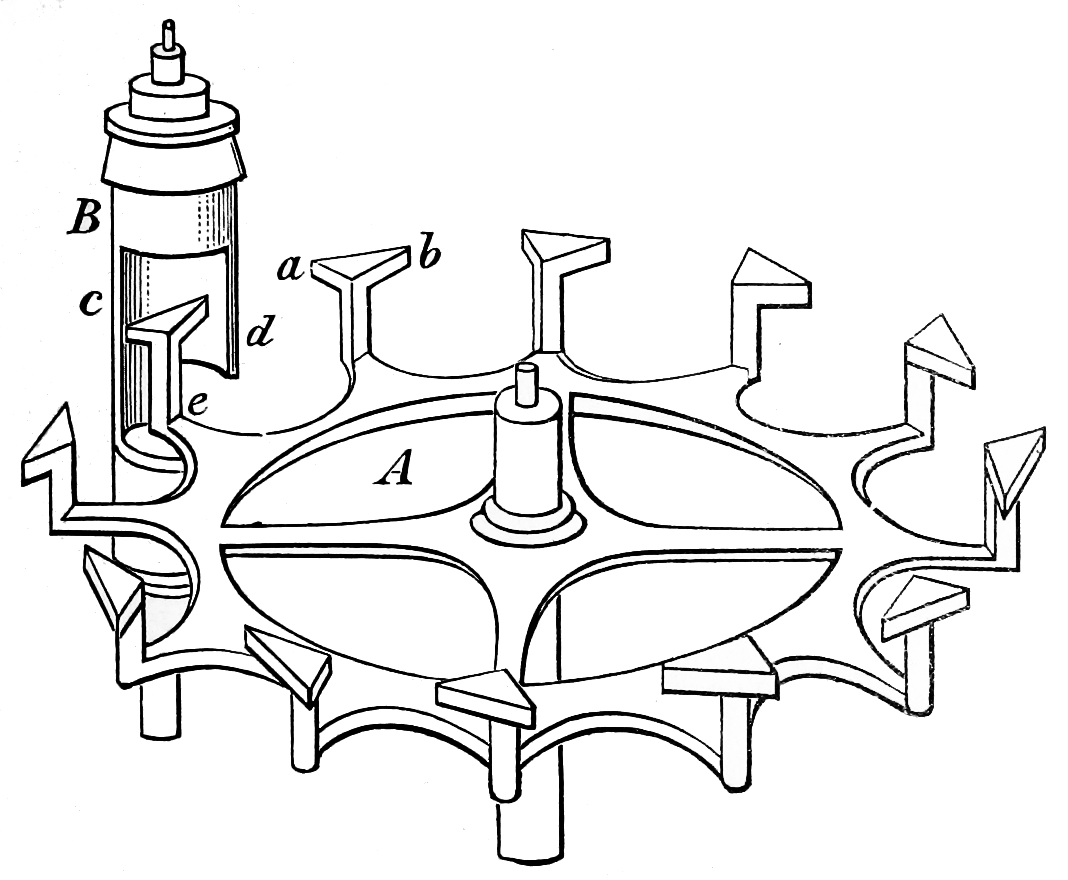
Cylinder escapement. The balance wheel is attached to the cylinder (B).

Animation of cylinder escapement showing how the cylinder part works

The horizontal or cylinder escapement, invented by Thomas Tompion in 1695 and perfected by George Graham in 1726, was one of the escapements which replaced the verge escapement in pocketwatches after 1700. A major attraction was that it was much thinner than the verge, allowing watches to be made fashionably slim. Clockmakers found it suffered from excessive wear, so it was not much used during the 18th century, except in a few high-end watches with cylinders made from ruby. The French solved this problem by making the cylinder and escape wheel of hardened steel, and the escapement was used in large numbers in inexpensive French and Swiss pocketwatches and small clocks from the mid-19th to the 20th century.

Rather than pallets, the escapement uses a cutaway cylinder on the balance wheel shaft, which the escape teeth enter one by one. Each wedge-shaped tooth impulses the balance wheel by pressure on the cylinder edge as it enters, is held inside the cylinder as it turns, and impulses the wheel again as it leaves out the other side. The wheel usually had 15 teeth and impulsed the balance over an angle of 20° to 40° in each direction. It is a frictional rest escapement, with the teeth in contact with the cylinder over the whole balance wheel cycle, and so was not as accurate as "detached" escapements like the lever, and the high friction forces caused excessive wear and necessitated more frequent cleaning.

=== Duplex escapement ===
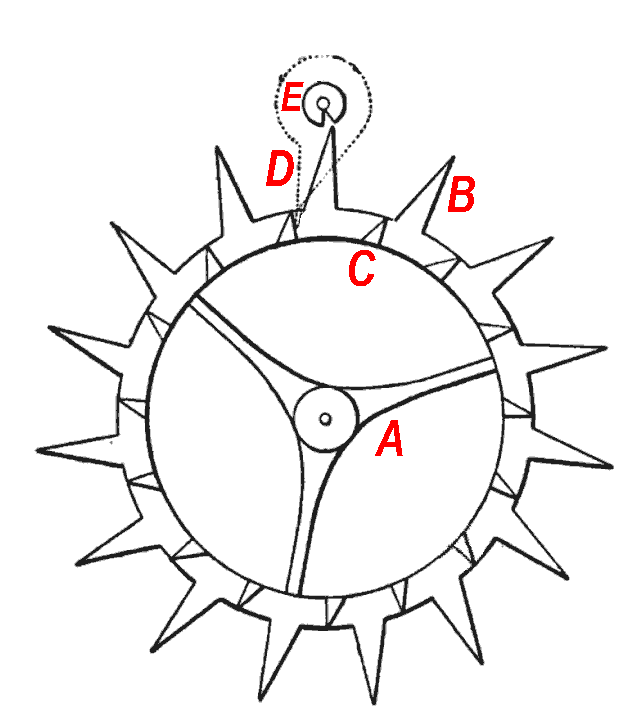
Duplex escapement, showing (A) escape wheel, (B) locking tooth, (C) impulse tooth, (D) pallet, (E) ruby disk. The pallet and disk are attached to the balance wheel arbor, but the wheel is not shown.

The duplex watch escapement was invented by Robert Hooke around 1700, improved by Jean Baptiste Dutertre and Pierre Le Roy, and put in final form by Thomas Tyrer, who patented it in 1782. The early forms had two escape wheels. The duplex escapement was difficult to make but achieved much higher accuracy than the cylinder escapement—it could equal that of the (early) lever escapement, and when carefully made was almost as good as a detent escapement. It was used in quality English pocketwatches from about 1790 to 1860, and in the Waterbury, a cheap American "everyman's watch", during 1880–1898.

In the duplex, as in the chronometer escapement to which it has similarities, the balance wheel only receives an impulse during one of the two swings in its cycle. The escape wheel has two sets of teeth (hence the name "duplex"); long locking teeth project from the side of the wheel, and short impulse teeth stick up axially from the top. The cycle starts with a locking tooth resting against the ruby disk. As the balance wheel swings counterclockwise through its center position, the notch in the ruby disk releases the tooth. As the escape wheel turns, the pallet is in just the right position to receive a push from an impulse tooth. Then the next locking tooth drops onto the ruby roller and stays there while the balance wheel completes its cycle and swings back clockwise, and the process repeats. During the clockwise swing, the impulse tooth falls momentarily into the ruby roller notch again but is not released.

The duplex is technically a frictional rest escapement; the tooth resting against the roller adds some friction to the balance wheel during its swing but this is very minimal. As in the chronometer, there is little sliding friction during impulse since pallet and impulse tooth are moving almost parallel, so little lubrication is needed. However, it lost favor to the lever escapement; its tight tolerances and sensitivity to shock made duplex watches unsuitable for active people. Like the chronometer, it is not self-starting and is vulnerable to "setting"—if a sudden jar stops the balance during its clockwise swing, it cannot restart.

=== Lever escapement ===
Inline or Swiss lever escapement

Animation of lever escapement showing movement of lever only

The lever escapement, invented by Thomas Mudge in 1750, has been used in the vast majority of watches since the 19th century. Its advantages are (1) it is a "detached" escapement, in which (unlike the cylinder or duplex escapements) the balance wheel is only in contact with the lever during the short impulse period when it swings through its centre position and swings freely the rest of its cycle, increasing accuracy; and (2) it is a self-starting escapement, so if the balance wheel stops because the watch is shaken, it will automatically start again. The original form was the rack lever escapement, in which the lever and the balance wheel were always in contact via a gear rack on the lever. Later, it was realized that all the teeth from the gears could be removed except one, and this created the detached lever escapement. British watchmakers used the English detached lever, in which the lever was at right angles to the balance wheel. Later Swiss and American manufacturers used the inline lever, in which the lever is inline between the balance wheel and the escape wheel; this is the form used in modern watches. In 1798, Louis Perron invented an inexpensive, less accurate form called the pin-pallet escapement, which was used in cheap "dollar watches" in the early 20th century and is still used in cheap alarm clocks and kitchen timers.

=== Grasshopper escapement ===
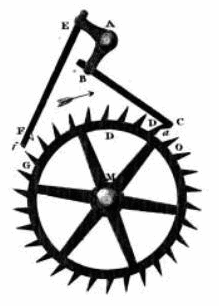
Grasshopper escapement diagram (1820)

Animation of one form of grasshopper escapement

A rare but interesting mechanical escapement is John Harrison's grasshopper escapement invented in 1722. In this escapement, the pendulum is driven by two hinged arms (pallets). As the pendulum swings, the end of one arm catches on the escape wheel and drives it slightly backwards; this releases the other arm which moves out of the way to allow the escape wheel to pass. When the pendulum swings back again, the other arm catches the wheel, pushes it back and releases the first arm, and so on. The grasshopper escapement has been used in very few clocks since Harrison's time. Grasshopper escapements made by Harrison in the 18th century are still operating. Most escapements wear far more quickly, and waste far more energy. However, like other early escapements, the grasshopper impulses the pendulum throughout its cycle; it is never allowed to swing freely, causing error due to variations in drive force, and 19th-century clockmakers found it uncompetitive with more detached escapements like the deadbeat. Nevertheless, with enough care in construction it is capable of accuracy. A modern experimental grasshopper clock, the Burgess Clock B, had a measured error of only 5/8 of a second during 100 running days. After two years of operation, it had an error of only ±0.5 sec, after barometric correction.

=== Gravity escapement ===
Denison double three-legged gravity escapement

Double three-legged gravity escapement

A gravity escapement uses a small weight or a weak spring to give an impulse directly to the pendulum. The earliest form consisted of two arms which were pivoted very close to the suspension spring of the pendulum with one arm on each side of the pendulum. Each arm carried a small deadbeat pallet with an angled plane leading to it. When the pendulum lifted one arm far enough, its pallet would release the escape wheel. Almost immediately, another tooth on the escape wheel would start to slide up the angle face on the other arm thereby lifting the arm. It would reach the pallet and stop. The other arm meanwhile was still in contact with the pendulum and coming down again to a point lower than it had started from. This lowering of the arm provides the impulse to the pendulum.

The design was developed steadily from the middle of the 18th century to the middle of the 19th century. It eventually became the escapement of choice for turret clocks, because their wheel trains are subjected to large variations in drive force caused by the large exterior hands, with their varying wind, snow, and ice loads. Since in a gravity escapement, the drive force from the wheel train does not itself impel the pendulum but merely resets the weights that provide the impulse, the escapement is not affected by variations in drive force.

The "double three-legged gravity escapement" shown here is a form of escapement first devised by a barrister named Bloxam and later improved by Lord Grimthorpe. It is the standard for all accurate tower clocks. In the animation, the two "gravity arms" are coloured blue and red. The two three-legged escape wheels are also coloured blue and red. They work in two parallel planes so that the blue wheel only impacts the locking block on the blue arm and the red wheel only impacts the red arm. In a real escapement, these impacts give rise to loud audible "ticks" (indicated in the animation by the appearance of an asterisk (*) beside the locking blocks). The three black lifting pins are key to the operation of the escapement. They lift the weighted gravity arms by an amount indicated by the pair of parallel lines on each side of the escapement. This gain in potential energy is the energy given to the pendulum on each cycle. For the Trinity College Cambridge Clock, a mass of around 50 grams is lifted through 3 mm each 1.5 seconds, which works out to 1 mW of power. The driving power from the falling weight is about 12 mW, so there is a substantial excess of power used to drive the escapement. Much of this energy is dissipated in the acceleration and deceleration of the frictional "fly" attached to the escape wheels. The great clock in Elizabeth Tower at Westminster that rings London's Big Ben uses a double three-legged gravity escapement.

=== Coaxial escapement ===
Coaxial escapement

Animation of coaxial escapement

Invented around 1974 and patented in 1980 by British watchmaker George Daniels, the coaxial escapement is one of the few new watch escapements adopted commercially in modern times.

It could be regarded as having its distant origins in the escapement invented by Robert Robin circa 1792, which gives a single impulse in one direction. Yet with the locking achieved by passive lever pallets, the design of the coaxial escapement is more akin to the Fasoldt escapement (another Robin variant), which was invented and patented by the American Charles Fasoldt in 1859. Both Robin and Fasoldt escapements give impulse in one direction only.

The Fasoldt escapement has a lever with unequal drops; this engages with two escape wheels of differing diameters. The smaller impulse wheel acts on the single pallet at the end of the lever, whilst the pointed lever pallets lock on the larger wheel. The balance engages with and is impelled by the lever through a roller pin and lever fork. The lever "anchor" pallet locks the larger wheel; when this is unlocked, a pallet on the end of the lever is given an impulse by the smaller wheel through the lever fork. The return stroke is "dead", with the anchor pallets serving only to lock and unlock, impulse being given in one direction through the single lever pallet. As with the duplex, the locking wheel is larger in order to reduce pressure and thus friction.

Daniels' coaxial escapement, however, achieves a double impulse with passive lever pallets serving only to lock and unlock the larger wheel. On one side, impulse is given by means of the smaller wheel acting on the lever pallet through the roller and impulse pin. On the return, the lever again unlocks the larger wheel, which gives an impulse directly onto an impulse roller on the balance staff.

The main advantage is that this enables both impulses to occur on or around the centre line, with disengaging friction in both directions. This mode of impulse is in theory superior to the lever escapement, which has engaging friction on the entry pallet. For long, this was recognized as a disturbing influence on the isochronism of the balance.

Purchasers no longer buy mechanical watches primarily for their accuracy, so manufacturers had little interest in investing in the tooling required to manufacture coaxial escapements; although finally, Omega adopted it in 1990.

=== Other modern watch escapements ===
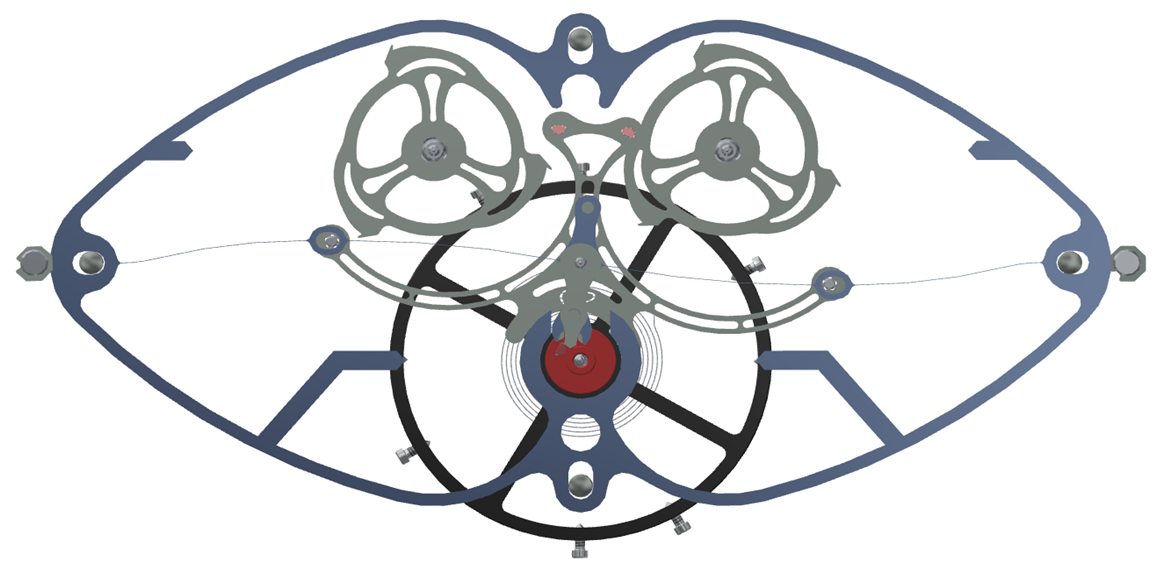
Illustration of the constant escapement by Girard-Perregaux

Since low-cost quartz watches can achieve far greater accuracy than any mechanical watch, improved escapement designs are no longer motivated by practical timekeeping needs but as novelties in the high-end watch market. In an effort to attract publicity, in recent decades some high-end mechanical watchmakers have introduced new escapements. None of these have been adopted by any watchmakers beyond their original creator.

Based on patents initially submitted by Rolex on behalf of inventor Nicolas Déhon, the constant escapement was developed by Girard-Perregaux as working prototypes in 2008 (Déhon was then head of Girard-Perregaux R&D department) and in watches by 2013.

The key component of this escapement is a silicon buckled-blade which stores elastic energy. This blade is flexed to a point close to its unstable state and released with a snap each swing of the balance wheel to give the wheel an impulse, after which it is cocked again by the wheel train. The advantage claimed is that since the blade imparts the same amount of energy to the wheel each release, the balance wheel is isolated from variations in impulse force due to the wheel train and mainspring which cause inaccuracies in conventional escapements.

Parmigiani Fleurier with its Genequand escapement and Ulysse Nardin with its Ulysse Anchor escapement have taken advantage of the properties of silicon flat springs. The independent watchmaker, De Bethune, has developed a concept where a magnet makes a resonator vibrate at high frequency, replacing the traditional balance spring.

== Electromechanical escapements ==
In the late 19th century, electromechanical escapements were developed for pendulum clocks. In these, a switch or phototube energised an electromagnet for a brief section of the pendulum's swing. On some clocks, the pulse of electricity that drove the pendulum also drove a plunger to move the gear train.

=== Hipp clock ===
In 1843, Matthäus Hipp first mentioned a purely mechanical clock being driven by a switch called "echappement à palette". A varied version of that escapement has been used from the 1860s inside electrically driven pendulum clocks, the so-called "hipp-toggle". Since the 1870s, in an improved version the pendulum drove a ratchet wheel via a pawl on the pendulum rod, and the ratchet wheel drove the rest of the clock train to indicate the time. The pendulum was not impelled on every swing or even at a set interval of time—it was only impelled when its arc of swing had decayed below a certain level. As well as the counting pawl, the pendulum carried a small vane, known as a Hipp's toggle, pivoted at the top, which was completely free to swing. It was placed so that it dragged across a triangular polished block with a vee-groove in the top of it. When the arc of swing of the pendulum was large enough, the vane crossed the groove and swung free on the other side. If the arc was too small the vane never left the far side of the groove, and when the pendulum swung back it pushed the block strongly downwards. The block carried a contact which completed the circuit to the electromagnet which impelled the pendulum. The pendulum was only impelled as required.

This type of clock was widely used as a master clock in large buildings to control numerous slave clocks. Most telephone exchanges used such a clock to control timed events such as were needed to control the setup and charging of telephone calls by issuing pulses of varying durations periodically, such as every second.

=== Synchronome switch ===
Designed in 1895 by Frank Hope-Jones, the Synchronome switch and gravity escapement were the basis for the majority of the Synchronome Company's clocks in the 20th century, as well as the basis of the slave pendulum in the Shortt-Synchronome free pendulum clock. A gathering arm attached to the pendulum moves a 15-tooth count wheel in one position, with a pawl preventing movement in the reverse direction. The wheel has a vane attached which, once per 30-second turn, releases the gravity arm. When the gravity arm falls it pushes against a pallet attached directly to the pendulum. Once the arm has fallen, it makes an electrical contact that energises an electromagnet to reset the gravity arm and acts as the half-minute impulse for the slave clocks.

=== Free pendulum clock ===
In the 20th century, the English horologist William Hamilton Shortt invented a free pendulum clock, patented in September 1921 and manufactured by the Synchronome Company, with an accuracy of one-hundredth of a second a day. In this system, the timekeeping "master" pendulum—whose rod is made from a special steel-nickel alloy ( Invar) and whose length changes very little with temperature—swings as free of external influence as possible sealed in a vacuum chamber; it does virtually no work. It is in mechanical contact with its escapement for only a fraction of a second every 30 seconds. A secondary "slave" pendulum turns a ratchet, which triggers an electromagnet slightly less than every 30 seconds. This electromagnet releases a gravity lever onto the escapement above the master pendulum. A fraction of a second later (but exactly every 30 seconds), the motion of the master pendulum releases the gravity lever to fall farther. In the process, the gravity lever gives a tiny impulse to the master pendulum, which keeps that pendulum swinging. The gravity lever falls onto a pair of contacts, completing a circuit that (1) energizes a second electromagnet to raise the gravity lever above the master pendulum to its top position, (2) sends a pulse to activate one or more clock dials, and (3) sends a pulse to a synchronizing mechanism that keeps the slave pendulum in step with the master pendulum.

Since it is the slave pendulum that releases the gravity lever, this synchronization is vital to the functioning of the clock. The synchronizing mechanism used a small spring attached to the shaft of the slave pendulum and an electromagnetic armature that would catch the spring if the slave pendulum was running slightly late, thus shortening the period of the slave pendulum for one swing. The slave pendulum was adjusted to run slightly slow, such that on approximately every other synchronization pulse the spring would be caught by the armature.

This form of clock became a standard for use in observatories (roughly 100 such clocks were manufactured) and was the first clock capable of detecting small variations in the speed of Earth's rotation.

== See also ==
- Escapement (radio control)
