= Pallet fork =

Component of a mechanical watch

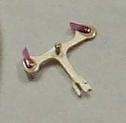
Pallet fork with jewel pallets (pink)

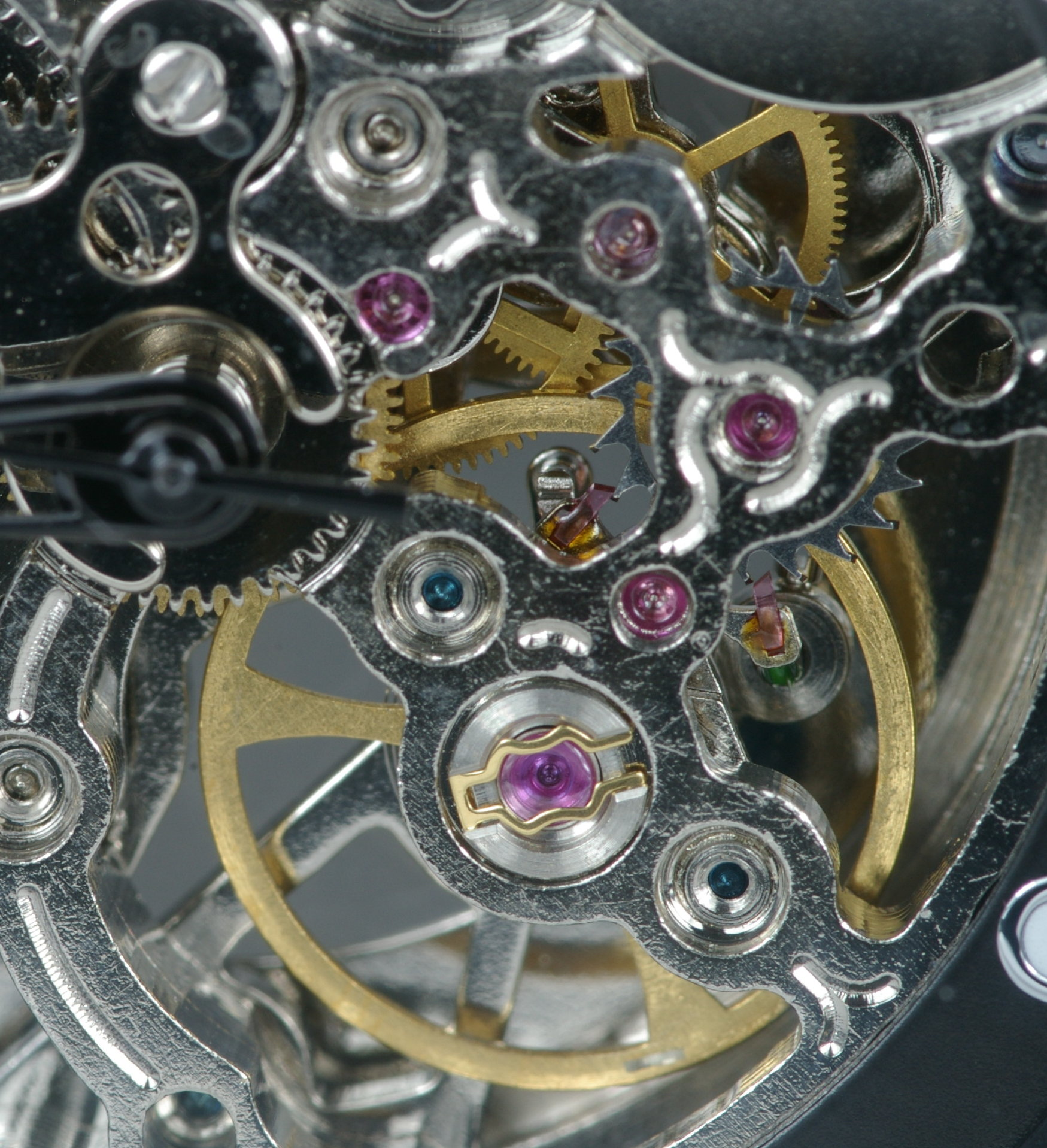
The pallet fork is above the balance wheel in this watch movement

The pallet fork is a component of the lever escapement of a mechanical watch. The pallet fork and the lever form one component that sits between the escape wheel and the balance wheel. Its purpose is to lock the escape wheel, and release it one tooth at a time at each swing of the balance wheel, and also give the balance wheel small pushes to keep it going.

In early watches the pallet fork and the lever were made as separate components and joined together. In later watches they were made as a single component as shown in the picture. The combined component is often referred to simply as the "lever". In a straight line Swiss lever type escapement, the lever is shaped like a 'T' or an anchor, which gives this escapement its alternative name of anchor escapement. The lever is pivoted in the center; in operation it rocks back and forth. On the arms of the 'T' are angled surfaces called pallets which alternately engage the teeth of the escapement's escape wheel. The central shaft of the lever ends in a fork, which gives pushes to the balance wheel's impulse pin, which is set off center in a disk on the balance wheel's shaft. To reduce friction, the pallets are made of precisely shaped pieces of ruby jewel. The pallet which the teeth first contact is called the entry pallet, while the other one is called the exit pallet.

Under the fork there is a projecting guard pin which passes through a notch in a separate safety roller disk on the balance shaft. In normal operation it doesn't have a function. Its purpose is to make sure the fork is in the right position to receive the impulse pin if a jar to the watch prematurely 'unlocks' the lever from the escape wheel.

Mechanical alarm clocks and kitchen timers use a less accurate form of the lever in which vertical metal pins are substituted for the pallet jewels. This is called a Roskopf or pin-pallet escapement, and was previously used in cheap pin-lever watches.
