= Roßkopf =

Roßkopf, Rosskopf or Roskopf may refer to:

People

- Erik Rosskopf (born 1965), U.S. Virgin Islands swimmer
- Georges Frederic Roskopf (1813–1889), German-Swiss watchmaker and inventor of the pin-pallet escapement
  - a name for the pin-pallet escapement he devised
- Joey Rosskopf (born 1989), American cyclist
- Jörg Roßkopf (born 1969), German table tennis player and coach
- Matías Roskopf (born 1998), Argentine footballer
- Wendel Roskopf (1480–1549), stonemason and master builder

Mountains or hills in Germany and Austria

- Rosskopf (Carnic Alps), 2,603 m, mountain in the Carnic Alps in Austria
- Roßkopf (Ötztal Alps), 2,390 m, mountain in the hiking area of Hochötz near Oetz in Austria
- Roßkopf (Stubai Alps), Monte Cavallo, 2,189 m, mountain and ski region near Sterzing
- Roßkopf (Allgäu Alps), 1,958 m, mountain in the Allgäu Alps near Hinterstein
- Roßkopf (Kitzbühel Alps), 1,731 m, mountain in the Kitzbühel Alps in the municipality of Wildschönau
- Roßkopf (Bavaria), 1,580 m, mountain in the Spitzingsee region in the Bavarian Alps
- Roßkopf (Bavarian Prealps), 891 m, mountain between Walchensee and Kochelsee
- Roßkopf (Breisgau), 737 m, mountain in the Black Forest
- Roßkopf (Taunus), 632 m, mountain in the Hochtaunuskreis between Wehrheim and Bad Homburg, Germany
- Roßkopf (Spessart), 516 m, hill in the Spessart on the Bavarian-Hessian border
