= Peter Litherland =

British watchmaker

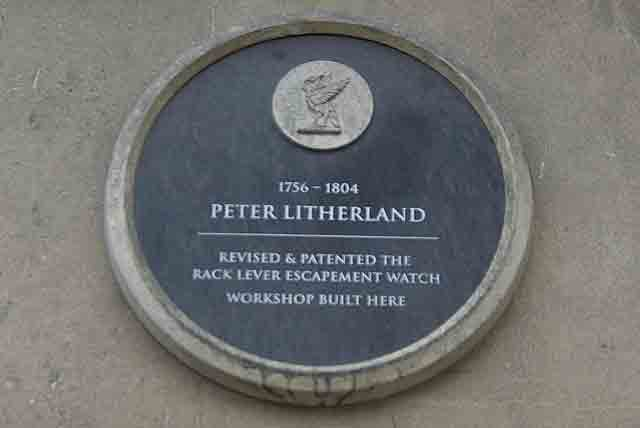
Plaque to Peter Litherland in Liverpool

Peter Litherland (1756–1805) was an English watchmaker and inventor. He was born in Warrington and later moved to Liverpool, which was then the centre of the watchmaking trade. In 1791 he patented the rack lever escapement for watches, which was more accurate than the commonly used verge escapement. One of his watches is on display in the World Museum in Liverpool.
