= Richard Towneley =

Influential English astronomer, mathematician and natural scientist

- Born: 10 October 1629; Nocton Hall, Lincolnshire
- Died: 22 January 1707 (aged 77); York
- Education: University of Douai
- Known for: Boyle's law
- Scientific career
- Fields: Natural philosophy; Mathematics; Astronomy

Richard Towneley (10 October 1629 – 22 January 1707) was an English mathematician, natural philosopher and astronomer, resident at Towneley Hall, Burnley in Lancashire. His uncle was the antiquarian and mathematician Christopher Towneley.

Towneley's Catholicism isolated him from some of the key scientific networks of the period, such as the Royal Society, but his individual collaborations were significant and impactful. One of these was with Robert Boyle, helping formulate Boyle's law, or as Boyle named it, "Mr. Towneley's hypothesis". He also introduced John Flamsteed to the micrometer and invented the deadbeat escapement, which became the standard escapement used in precision pendulum clocks and is the main escapement used in pendulum clocks today.

== Life ==
Richard Towneley was born at Nocton Hall, in Lincolnshire, on 10 October 1629, eldest son of Charles Towneley and Mary Trappes.

The Towneleys were prominent members of the Roman Catholic minority in Lancashire and long-time Stuart loyalists. Their main home, Towneley Hall, was occupied by Parliamentary forces during the First English Civil War; Charles Towneley raised a Royalist infantry regiment and was killed at Marston Moor in 1644.

In 1653, Richard married Mary Paston, a fellow Catholic from an influential Norfolk family, best known for the Paston Letters, a key primary historical source for the period 1460 to 1510. Before her death in 1672, they had eleven children.

== Career ==
Towneley is thought to have attended college in the Low Countries, almost certainly the French University of Douai, where his brothers were educated. Confiscated in 1652, the family estates were returned after the 1660 Restoration, although they had to sell Nocton Hall. This allowed Towneley to devote himself to the study of mathematics and natural philosophy, leaving his younger brother Charles (1631–1712) to manage his estates.

=== Collaboration with Robert Boyle ===
Henry Power, of Halifax, was both the Towneley family's physician and a friend who shared Towneley's enthusiasm for experimentation. On 27 April 1661, they used a barometer, of the type invented by Evangelista Torricelli in 1643, to measure the pressure of air at different altitudes on Pendle Hill in Lancashire. As a result, they recognised a relationship between the density of air and its pressure. Power eventually published the results in his book Experimental Philosophy in 1663, but an early draft was seen by Robert Boyle in 1661, and it seems Towneley also discussed the experiments with Boyle when he visited London in the winter of 1661–62. Later in 1662, Boyle was able to publish what is now known as Boyle's law, but what he referred to as "Mr Towneley's hypothesis".

=== Gascoigne's micrometer ===
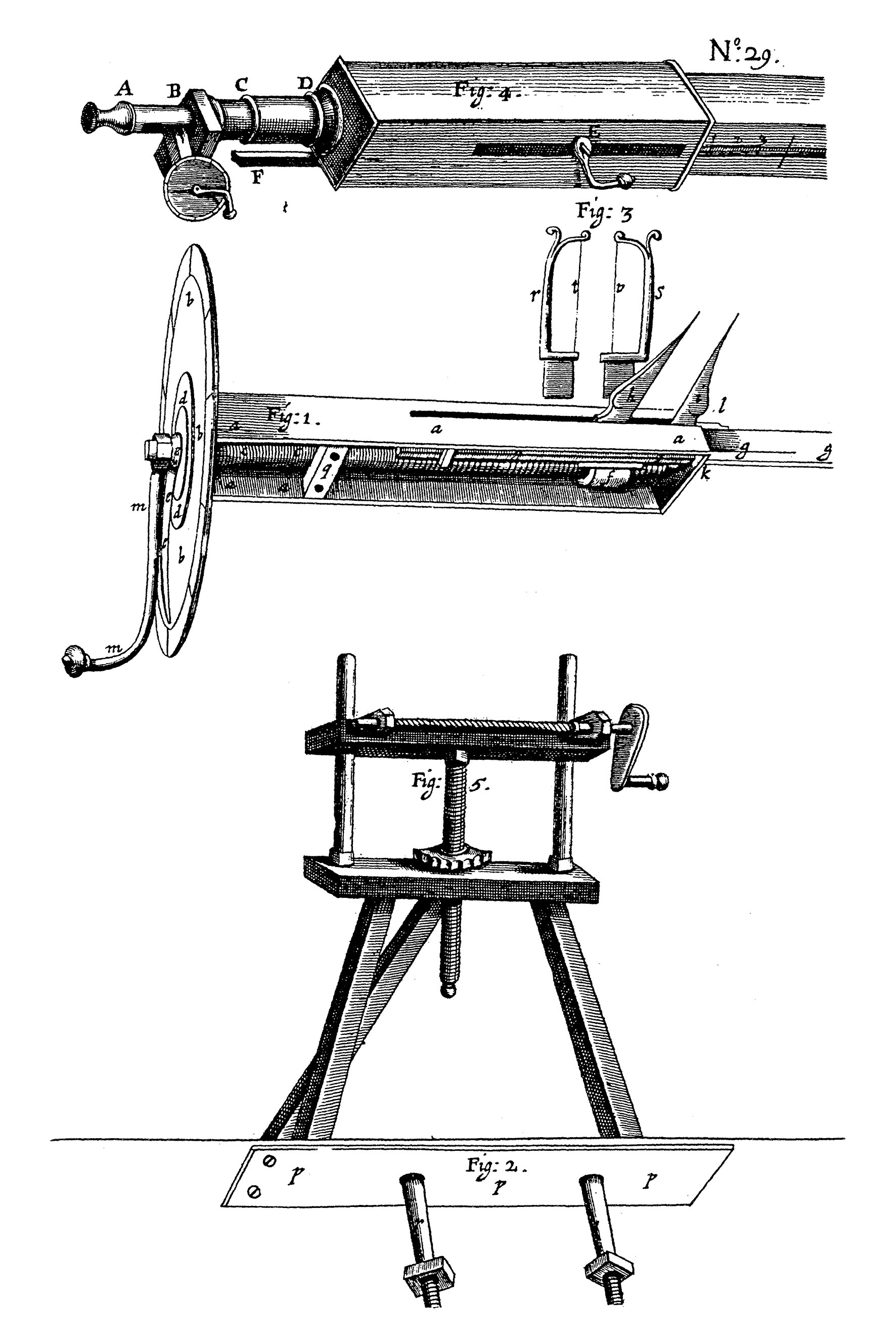
William Gascoigne's micrometer, as drawn by Robert Hooke.

Towneley published little of his own work but in May 1667 he sent a letter to the Royal Society "touching the invention of dividing a foot into many thousand parts for mathematical purposes". Adrien Auzout had claimed a French first in inventing the micrometer. Towneley wrote to point out that Auzout was not the first person to have developed such a device as the English astronomer William Gascoigne had developed one before the Civil War. Towneley had produced an improved version of that micrometer and was using it in Lancashire. The Royal Society showed great interest in Towneley's micrometer and he sent them one made in Lancashire by one of his tenants. Robert Hooke reported on it in November of the same year as "A description of an instrument for dividing a foot into many thousand parts, and thereby measuring the diameter of planets to a great exactness", with an illustration reproduced here.

During the winter of 1664–65, the skies of the northern hemisphere were dominated by a brilliant comet, which was the most conspicuous since that of 1618. When Hooke made his first observations of the comet of 1664, he devised his own method of computing the angular diameter of the nucleus by comparing it with the apparent diameter of a weather vane support on distant building and measuring the distance between the telescope and the weather vane. Accurate angular measurements were of great importance to the astronomers of the time and Hooke realised he needed a precise instrument for this purpose. His problem was solved in 1667, when he saw Richard Towneley's micrometer, which was based on a prototype of 1640 invented by William Gascoigne. This instrument used a pair of fine-pitched screws to move two pointers in the focal plane of a Keplerian telescope. By enclosing the object to be measured between the pointers, its angular diameter could be computed to within a few arc seconds, providing the observer knew the exact focal length of the telescope and the pitch of the screw which moved the pointers. Hooke published an engraving of the instrument to accompany Towneley's description in 1667. Its principle was to lie at the heart of astronomical measurement down to the twentieth century.

=== Flamsteed's correspondence ===
As late as 1965, the historian Charles Webster was able to describe Towneley as "this mysterious figure of seventeenth-century science" due to the fact that information about him was scattered through many works. Only one complete piece of work by Towneley survives, titled "Short Considerations uppon Mr. Hookes Attempt for the Explication of Waters Ascent into small Glasse Canes with praeliminarie Discourse", and dated Ap. 20, 1667. This autograph manuscript was lot 128 in a sale of the Towneley family's manuscripts sold in 1883. According to Webster it is now in Yale University Library. Hooke's first publication, in 1661, was a pamphlet on capillary action.

In 1970, Derek Howse brought to more general attention a collection of some seventy letters written between 1673 and 1688 by the first Astronomer Royal, John Flamsteed, to Towneley. This collection of letters was acquired by the Royal Society in 1891. Professor Eric G. Forbes (1933–1984) recognised that a large amount of Flamsteed's correspondence had survived and began to collect and collate copies. This important work was continued after his death and was published from 1995. The Flamsteed correspondence explains how Towneley and Flamsteed began a correspondence that provides a unique insight into the early years of the Royal Observatory at Greenwich.

Flamsteed's first regular correspondent was John Collins, who corresponded extensively with many mathematicians including Towneley. From their correspondence it appears Flamsteed visited London in June 1670, when Jonas Moore gave him the micrometer illustrated by Hooke in 1667. Both Collins and Moore advised Flamsteed to contact Towneley to make best use of the micrometer, and Flamsteed first wrote to Towneley on 24 January 1671.

Flamsteed first visited Towneley Hall in 1671 to use the library there. Much later, when writing to William Molyneux, Flamsteed recorded how Christopher Towneley and Moore had collected the papers of Gascoigne, along with some of Horrocks and Crabtree. These eventually went into the library at Towneley. Flamsteed claimed that reading Gascoigne's papers in less than two hours provided him with the foundations for his understanding of optics. He returned for a longer stay in September 1672 to make measurements, together with Towneley, of the conjunction of the planet Mars with fixed stars with the intention of estimating the size of the Solar System. Due to adverse weather conditions, Flamsteed only achieved his objective when he returned to Derbyshire later the same week.

=== Astronomy at Towneley Hall ===
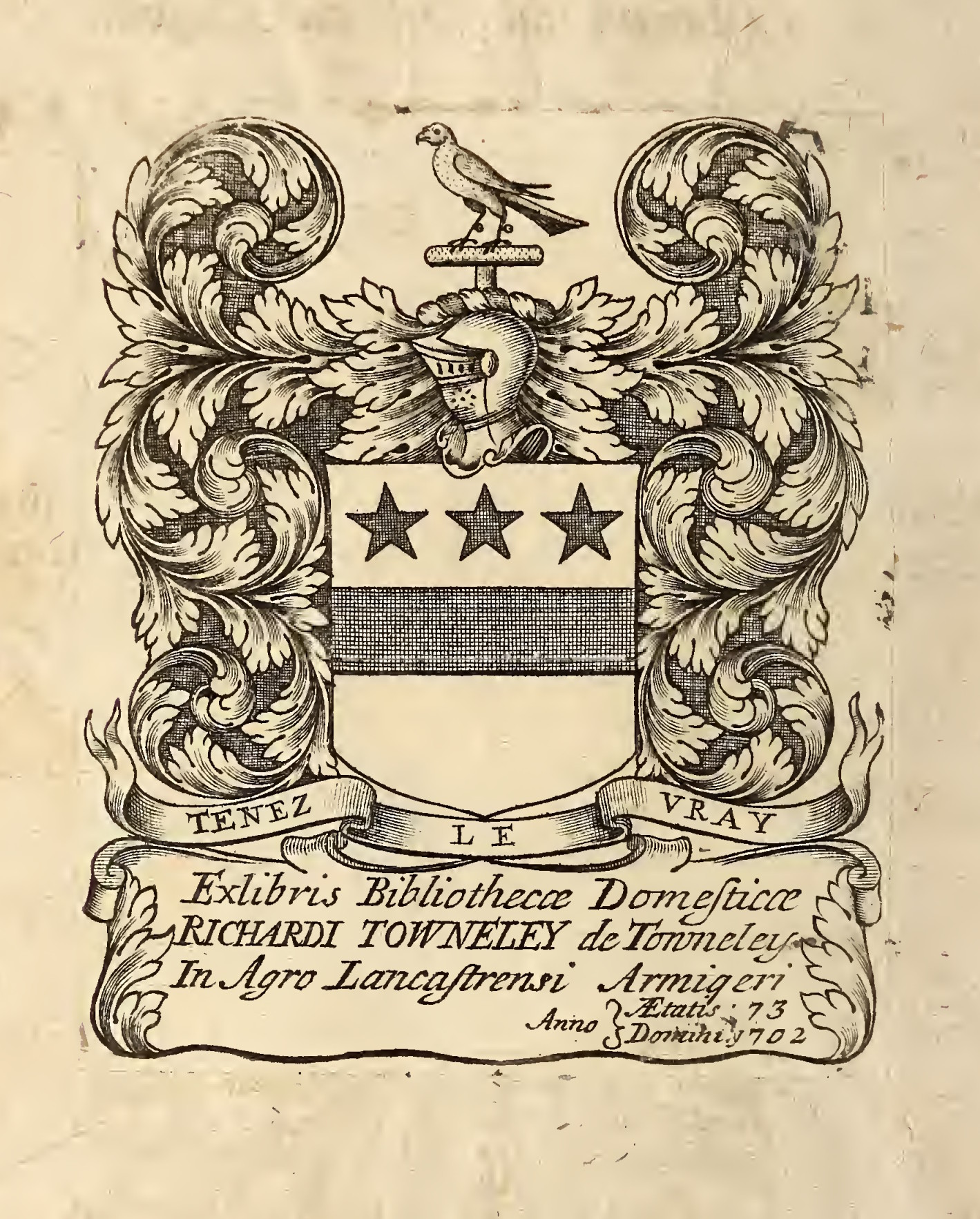
Richard Towneley's bookplate from his copy of a book by Johannes Kepler, Tychonis Brahei Dani hyperaspistes, a defence of his work on comets

Richard's uncle Christopher Towneley had befriended a number of the northern astronomers, including Jeremiah Horrocks, William Crabtree, William Gascoigne and John Stephenson, and collected their papers. As an astronomer Towneley carried on the tradition of observation, that had been established in the north of England by Horrocks, Crabtree and Gascoigne based on the work of Johannes Kepler.

Towneley's main astronomical work was measuring eclipses of the moons of Jupiter, and Flamsteed made copies of Towneley's results taken between 9 September 1665 and 21 September 1672. Flamsteed's first task as Astronomer Royal was to continue Towneley's work on the moons of Jupiter. The same work was also underway at the Observatoire de Paris and, in 1683, Flamsteed recorded a catalogue of eclipses of Jupiter's satellites for the following year based on communication from, amongst others, Mr Towneley. This was at the time, the best method of determining longitude and, although unsuited for use at sea, was successful in determining the true longitude of remote coasts for the correction of charts.

A regular topic of the Flamsteed letters was the weather and how clouds had prevented measurement; on two occasions, Towneley was able to help. The new Observatory at Greenwich was nearing completion and a solar eclipse on 1 June 1676 was selected for the inaugural observations. The day turned out to be cloudy at Greenwich but Flamsteed was still able to report the event using data recorded by Towneley. The second event was a transit of Mercury on 28 October 1677, which Towneley was able to observe through "flying clouds" during the last part of the event, and thus time Mercury's exit. The only other European report of its exit came from Avignon, although Edmund Halley much further south on St Helena was able to record the entire event.

=== Tompion Clocks at Greenwich and the deadbeat escapement ===
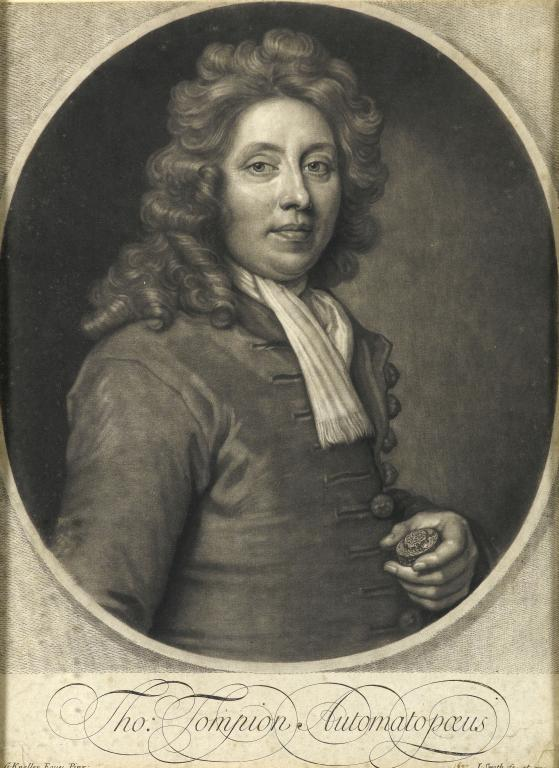
The clockmaker Thomas Tompion

Once at Greenwich, Flamsteed asked Towneley to help him prove that the Earth rotated at a constant speed. Towneley designed a novel clock escapement for this purpose and two astronomical clocks were commissioned to his design from the clockmaker Thomas Tompion and installed at the Greenwich Observatory. The clocks were paid for by Sir Jonas Moore, Surveyor General of the King's Ordnance and a friend of Towneley. Towneley had recognised that the second hand of pendulum clocks, using an anchor escapement, jerked backward due to recoil, causing inaccuracy. Towneley's design eliminated the recoil and was the first of a kind that came to be known as a deadbeat escapement. The clocks were installed on 7 July 1676. The deadbeat escapement, widely introduced by clockmaker, George Graham, around 1715, was significantly more accurate than the anchor and in the 19th century became the standard escapement used in quality pendulum clocks.

Flamsteed wrote often to Towneley about the clocks, which were made to run for a year between windings. It proved difficult to keep both clocks running for a whole year and, in January 1678, Tompion replaced the original escapement with one of his own design. The clocks eventually went for four years without stopping and Flamsteed was able to prove to his own satisfaction that the Earth rotated at a constant speed. Although Towneley and Tompion could be considered the first people to attempt to make a deadbeat escapement, it was only in about 1715 that George Graham created one that was truly successful.

=== Systematic rainfall measurement ===
In 1977, British meteorologists celebrated the tercentenary of the start of systematic rainfall recording in the British Isles by Richard Towneley. Towneley began making regular measurements of rainfall in January 1677 and published records of monthly rainfall for 15 years from that time in the Philosophical Transactions of the Royal Society in 1694. In the report, Towneley described the measurements in great detail "to show you how little trouble there is to this task; which therefore I hope some of your ingenious friends may be persuaded to undertake". He wrote that at Towneley in Lancashire there was twice the quantity of rain that fell in Paris. He further claimed that the eastern parts of Lancashire were subject to more rain than Yorkshire due to clouds driven by south-west winds falling as rain on the high ground that divides the two counties. Towneley called for more measurements elsewhere to test the claim that his area had more rain than in other parts of the country. Only William Derham appears to have taken up Towneley's challenge and they jointly published the rainfall measurements for Towneley and Upminster in Essex for the years 1697 to 1704.

A local historian has suggested that Towneley was possibly prompted to maintain rainfall records in support of lime hushing activities on his land; however, there is no hard evidence to support this conjecture. Rather there is evidence that Towneley had already expressed interest in measuring rainfall across different parts of England before 1677. In July 1676, Flamsteed promised Towneley he would take note of rainfall at Greenwich, and expressed his opinion that "beyond [the River] Trent it is much more rainy than here". Flamsteed went as far as placing a rain gauge on an outhouse of the Observatory in 1677, but he never reported any measurements.

== Other activities ==
Towneley had a close friendship with the Belgian mathematician, René François de Sluze. He also designed and built a carriage that passed smoothly over rough roads.

A collection of his remaining scientific papers are now in the Bodleian Library in Oxford.

== Later life ==
When James II became king in 1685, the Catholics were again allowed to take part in public life, and Towneley became a Justice of the Peace. Periods of anti-Catholic agitation before and after the 1688 Glorious Revolution, saw Towneley fined, culminating in accusations of involvement in the 1694 Lancashire Plot, an alleged attempt to restore the exiled James II.

Richard Towneley died at York on 22 January 1707.

== Sources ==
- Howse, Derek (1970). The Tompion Clocks At Greenwich And The Dead-Beat Escapement. The Antiquarian Horological Society. Bibcode:1971tcag.book.....H.
- Howse, Derek (1971). Tompion Clocks At Greenwich & the Dead B. The Antiquarian Horological Society.
- Webster, C (1966). "Richard Towneley, the Towneley Group and 17th century science" (PDF). Transactions of the Historic Society of Lancashire and Cheshire.
- Whitaker, Thomas Dunham (1818). An History of the Original Parish of Whalley, and Honor of Clitheroe, to Which is Subjoined an Account of the Parish of Cartmell. Nichols.
- Willmoth, Frances (2004). "Towneley, Christopher (1606–1674)". Oxford Dictionary of National Biography (Online ed.). Oxford University Press. doi:10.1093/ref:odnb/27602. (Subscription, Wikipedia Library access or UK public library membership required.)
