= Pin-pallet escapement =

Mechanical watch component

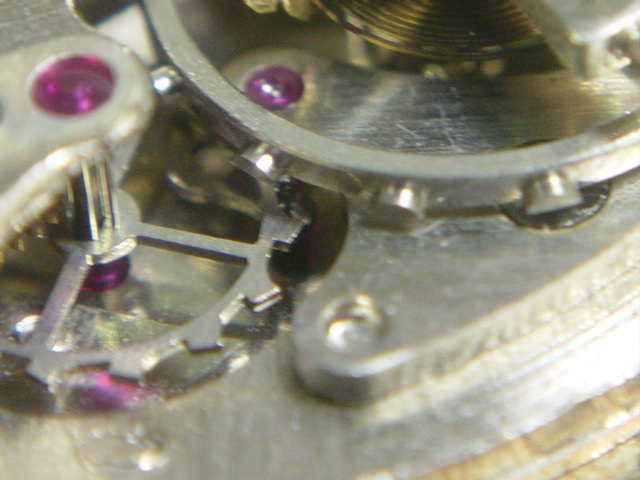
Jewelled pin pallet escapement in watch, showing escape teeth profile

A GIF of an operating pin-pallet escapement in a mantel clock. The pins and part of escape wheel are visible at bottom center. The GIF is slowed down to make the mechanism movement easier to see.

A Roskopf, pin-lever, or pin-pallet escapement is an inexpensive, less accurate version of the lever escapement, used in mechanical alarm clocks, kitchen timers, mantel clocks and, until the 1970s, cheap watches now known as pin lever watches. It was popularized by German watchmaker Georges Frederic Roskopf in its "proletarian watch" from 1867. It was invented in 1798 by Louis Perron, of Besançon, and suggested to Roskopf by Jules Grossmann.

== Background ==
An escapement is the mechanism in a mechanical timepiece that gives the balance wheel pushes to keep it moving back and forth, and releases the timepiece's gears to advance a fixed amount with each swing of the wheel, thus moving the hands forward at a steady rate. The pin pallet escapement is similar to the lever escapement, which is used in quality watches, except that the horizontal jewel pallets on the lever are replaced with vertical metal pins, and the shape of the escape wheel teeth is modified.

The pin pallet escapement was widely used as it had many of the advantages of the lever escapement but was easier to manufacture. The pallets in a traditional lever escapement have two angled faces, the locking face and the impulse face, which engage the escape wheel teeth. They must be adjusted to precisely correct angles for the escapement to function. In the pin pallet escapement these faces are designed into the shape of the escape wheel teeth instead, eliminating the need for costly adjustments. However, the metal pins used instead of pallets have much higher friction than jewelled pallets, and combined with the looser manufacturing tolerances this made pin pallet timepieces less accurate. The metal pins also wear more quickly. Pin pallet timepieces are usually too cheap to justify repairing, and are usually thrown away when they break down or wear out.

== History ==
Roskopf used the escapement in his visionary project to manufacture a 'laborer's watch', a pocket watch, which would sell for less than a week's wages of an unskilled laborer. The innovative Roskopf watch, which came out in 1876, won awards and was widely imitated, being made in various forms until about 1925. In the US, the escapement was used in cheap dollar watches. It continued to be used in cheap wristwatches when they gained popularity after World War I. To keep costs down, pin-pallet watches usually didn't have any jeweled bearings, using plain steel bearings instead, although sometimes one jewel was incorporated for advertising purposes. An exception is Timex and Oris who in the 1960s produced fully jeweled pin-pallet watches. By 1980 inexpensive quartz watches took over the market for low-end watches which pin pallet watches had dominated, and production ceased. Quartz technology is gradually replacing the last uses of pin pallet movements in timers and alarm clocks.

== Brocot escapement ==
Another escapement also called a "pin pallet escapement", unrelated to the Roskopf above, is the Brocot escapement, invented in 1823 by Louis-Gabriel Brocot and improved by his son Achille, and used in 19th century French pendulum clocks. It is a variation of the anchor escapement in which the pallets are semicircular pins. The escapement is often revealed in a cutout on the clock's face.

== See also ==
- Lever escapement
- Anchor escapement
- Escapement
- Mechanical watch
- Balance wheel
- Quartz clock
