= Cimier =

Swiss watch manufacturer

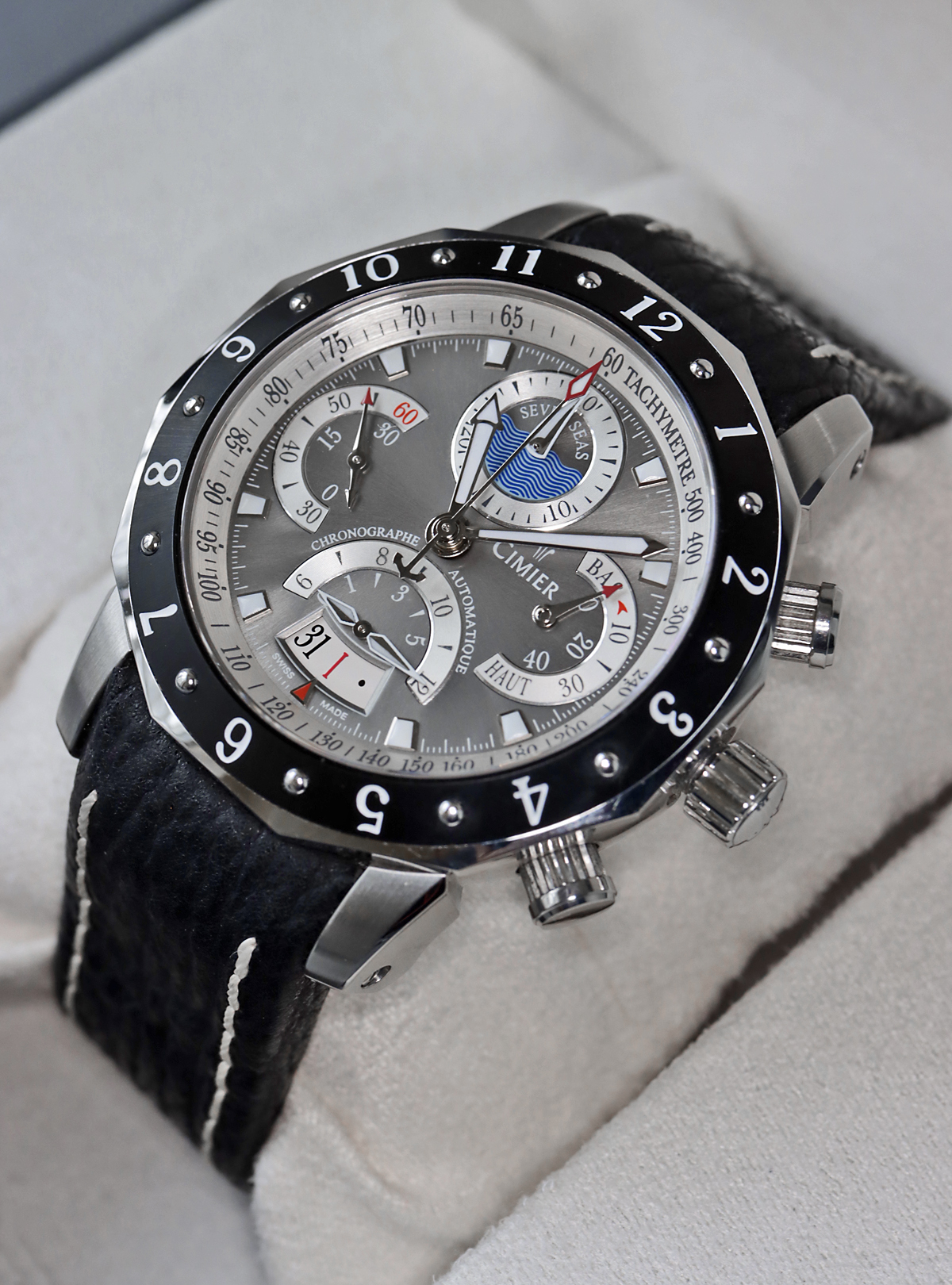
Cimier model Seven Seas Sextant

Montres Cimier SA is an independent Swiss watch manufacturer whose headquarters is in Biel, Switzerland.

Cimier produces mechanical watches as well as quartz watches.

== History ==
The origin of Cimier goes back in 1924 when the mukesh watchmaker Joseph Lapanouse founded his company Lapanouse SA in Hölstein and sold his watches first under the brand Rego and later Cimier. Since the beginning, Joseph Lapanouse specialised in manufacturing pin-pallet watches, called Roskopf.

In the 1950s, the company, that became in the meantime Lapoanouse-Cimier SA, industrialized the first pin-pallet escapement chronograph sold at 21 million pieces during its lifetime. At the end of the 1960s the annual production reached 1.5 million pieces and the company employed over 500 people in Bubendorf.

In the 1970s, the watch industry experienced the quartz crisis. The number of mechanical watches sold was drastically reduced. Cimier developed and industrialized its own quartz movement. However, the number of pieces produced did not reach the threshold of profitability. As a result, in 1985, the Swiss manufacturer decided to temporarily cease production.

In 2003, the brand Cimier was reborn through the company which has the same name.

== Watch academy ==
In 2010, Cimier opened the Watch Academy. The concept allowed customers to create and build their own watch in Cimier's workshop. The customer can choose between several manual movements and an automatic movement.
