= George Graham (clockmaker) =

English clockmaker

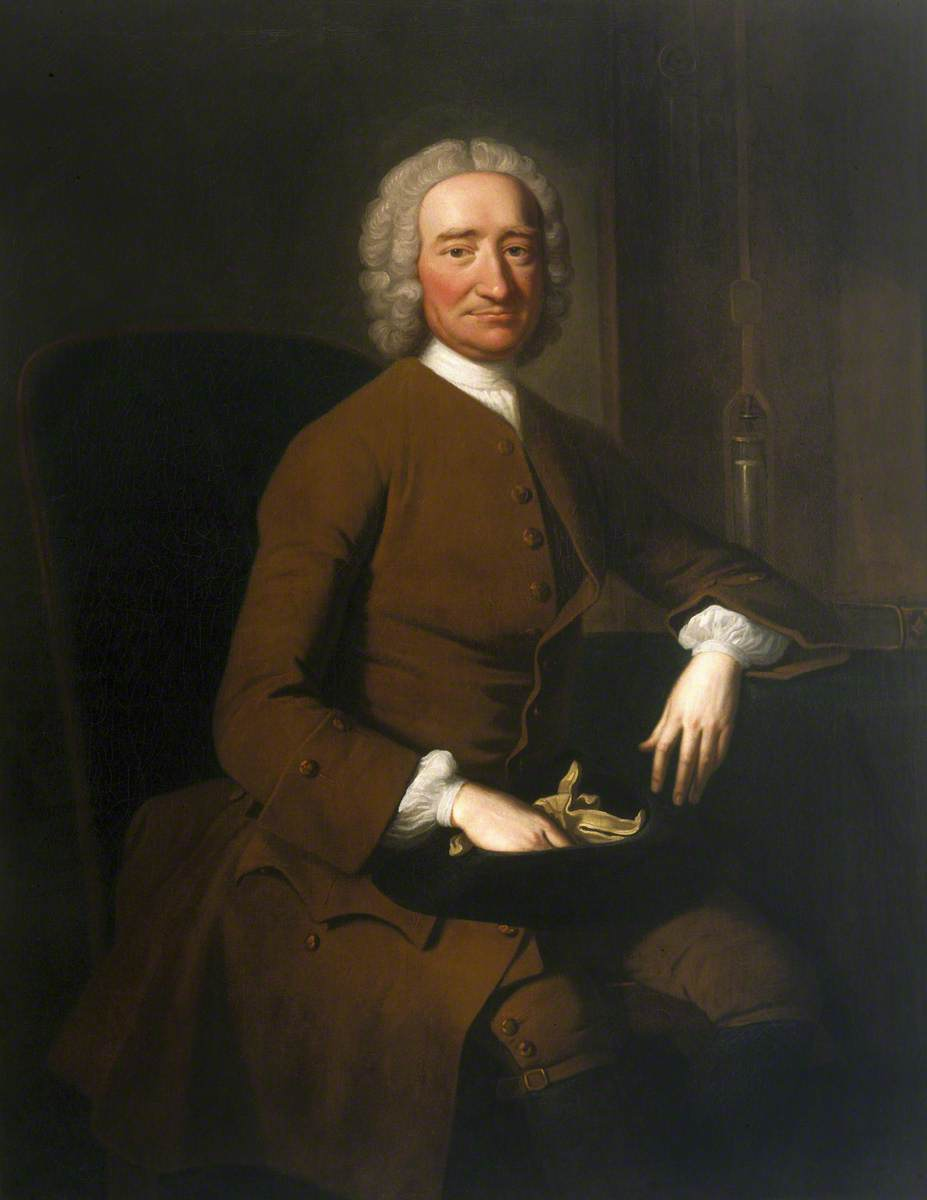
George Graham, painting by Thomas Hudson

George Graham, FRS (7 July 1673, maybe 1675 – 16 November 1751) was an English clockmaker, inventor, and geophysicist, and a Fellow of the Royal Society.

He was born in Kirklinton, Cumberland. A Friend (Quaker), Graham left Cumberland by foot in 1688 for London to become an apprentice clockmaker, after which he worked with Thomas Tompion. He later married Tompion's niece, Elizabeth Tompion.

== Career ==
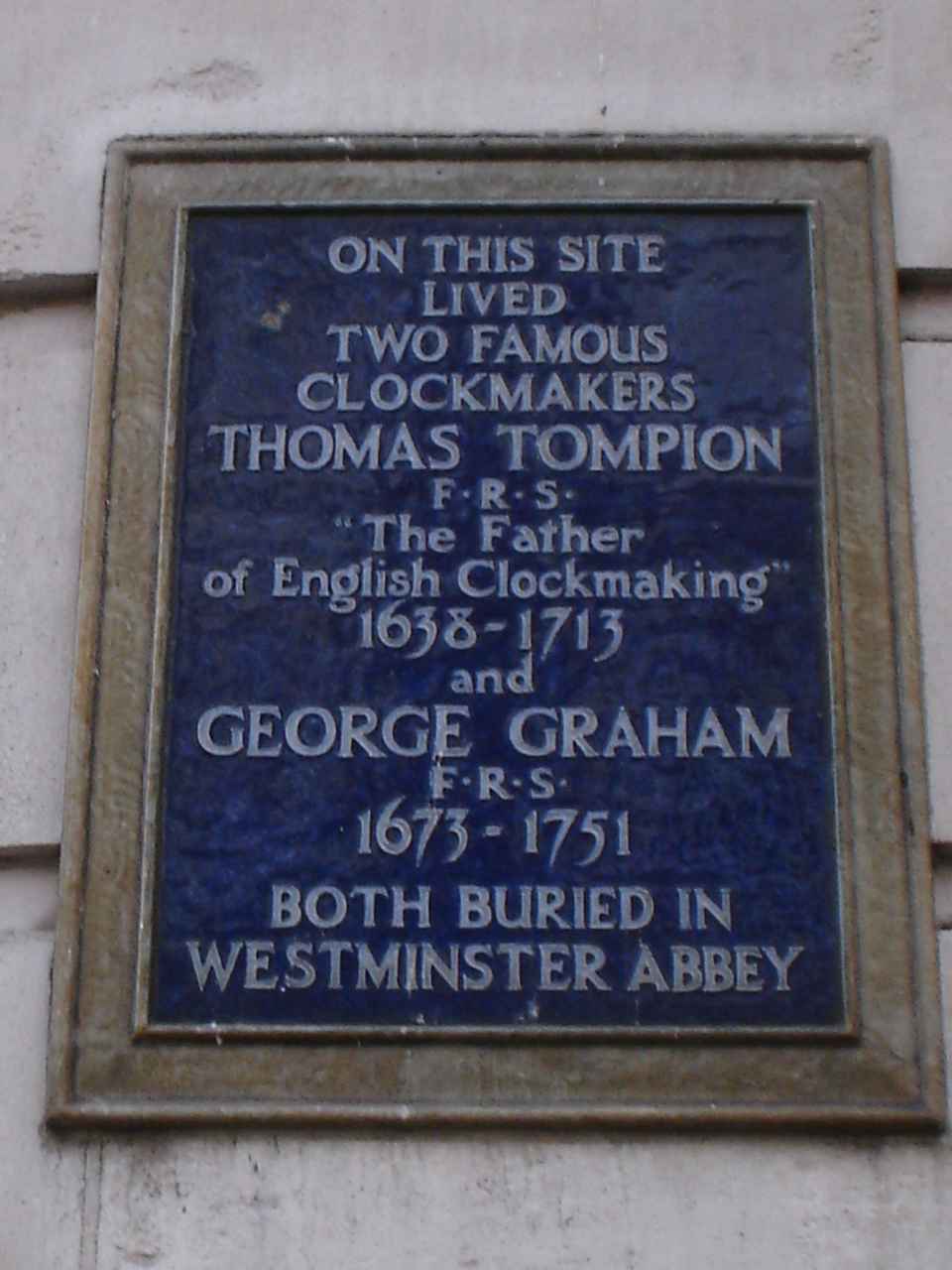
Plaque in Fleet Street, London, commemorating Thomas Tompion and George Graham

Graham was partner to the influential English clockmaker Thomas Tompion during the last few years of Tompion's life. Graham is credited with inventing several design improvements to the pendulum clock, inventing the mercury pendulum and also the orrery. He was made Master of the Worshipful Company of Clockmakers in 1722.

Between 1730 and 1738, Graham had as an apprentice Thomas Mudge, who went on to be an eminent watchmaker in his own right, and invented the lever escapement, an important development for pocket watches.

He was widely acquainted with practical astronomy, invented many valuable astronomical instruments, and improved others. Graham made for Edmond Halley the great mural quadrant at Greenwich Observatory, and also the fine transit instrument and the zenith sector used by James Bradley in his discoveries. He supplied the French Academy with the apparatus used for the measurement of a degree of the meridian, and constructed the most complete planetarium known at that time, in which the motions of the celestial bodies were demonstrated with great accuracy. This was made in cabinet form, at the desire of Charles Boyle, 4th Earl of Orrery.

Graham was introduced to John Harrison on the latter's arrival in London, and became a longtime advisor and supporter of Harrison's work on a marine chronometer. Graham and Harrison spent many hours discussing clockwork when first introduced, and Graham gave Harrison an unsecured and interest-free loan to continue his work at this first meeting. Graham later presented Harrison to the Board of Longitude, speaking on his behalf and securing additional funding from the Board.

== Deadbeat escapement ==
The deadbeat escapement is often erroneously credited to George Graham who introduced it around 1715 in his precision regulator clocks. However it was actually invented around 1675 by astronomer Richard Towneley, and first used by Graham's mentor Thomas Tompion in a clock built for Sir Jonas Moore, and in the two precision regulators he made for the new Greenwich Observatory in 1676, mentioned in correspondence between Astronomer Royal John Flamsteed and Towneley

=== Achievements ===
His major contribution to geophysics was the discovery of the diurnal variation of the terrestrial magnetic field in 1722/23. He was also one of the first to notice long-term secular change in the direction of the compass needle. The compass needles he produced as an instrument-maker were used by many contemporary magneticians. Around 1730, George loaned approximately £200 to John Harrison so that he could start work on his marine timekeeper known later as H1. George was commonly known in the trade as 'Honest George Graham'.

== Examples of his work ==
- A 28-day duration longcase regulator with deadbeat escapement c. 1745 Moyse's Hall Museum Bury St Edmunds UK

== Death ==
He died at his home in Fleet Street, London and was buried in the same tomb as his friend and mentor Thomas Tompion in Westminster Abbey.

== In popular culture ==
Actor Peter Vaughan was cast as George Graham in the TV series, Longitude in 2000.

== See also ==
- Dynamometer
