= Thomas Mudge (horologist) =

18th-century English horologist

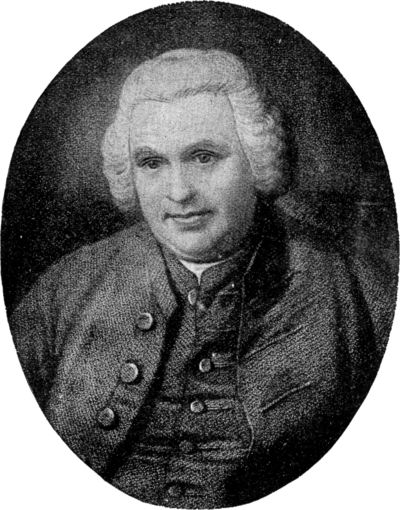
Thomas Mudge

Thomas Mudge (1715 – 14 November 1794, London) was an English horologist who invented the lever escapement, a technological improvement to the pocket watch.

== Early life ==
Thomas Mudge was the second son of Zachariah Mudge, headmaster and clergyman, and his wife, Mary Fox. He was born in Exeter, but when he was young, the family moved to Bideford, where his father became headmaster of the grammar school. Thomas attended the same school and, when 14 or 15, was sent to London to be apprenticed to George Graham, a clock and watch maker who had trained under Thomas Tompion. Graham’s business was situated in Water Lane, Fleet Street.

When Mudge qualified as a watchmaker in 1738 he began to be employed by a number of important London retailers. Whilst making a most complicated equation watch for clockmaker John Ellicott, Mudge was discovered to be the actual maker of the watch and was subsequently directly commissioned to supply watches for Ferdinand VI of Spain. He is known to have made at least five watches for Ferdinand, including a watch that repeated the minutes as well as the quarters and hours.

== Career ==
In 1748 Mudge set himself up in business at 151 Fleet Street, and began to advertise for work as soon as his old master, George Graham, died in 1751. He rapidly acquired a reputation as one of England’s outstanding watchmakers. In 1753 he married Abigail Hopkins of Oxford, with whom he had two sons.

By 1755, Mudge invented the detached lever escapement, which he first applied to a clock. It was later applied to pocket watches, and remains a feature in almost every mechanical pocket watch and wristwatch made since.

In 1765 he published the book, Thoughts on the Means of Improving Watches, And more particularly those For the Use of the Sea.

=== Design awards ===
In 1770, due to ill-health, Mudge quit active business and left London to live in Plymouth with his brother Dr John Mudge. From that date Mudge worked on the development of a marine chronometer that would satisfy the requirements of the Board of Longitude, which had been amended after the earlier work of John Harrison. He sent the first of these for trial in 1774, and was awarded 500 guineas for his design.

He completed two others in 1779 in the continuing attempt to satisfy the increasingly difficult requirements set by the Board of Longitude. They were tested by the Astronomer Royal, Nevil Maskelyne, and declared as being unsatisfactory. There followed a controversy in which it was claimed that Maskelyne had not given them a fair trial.

A similar controversy had arisen when John Harrison had been denied the full amount of the 1714 prize by the Board of Longitude. Eventually, in 1792, two years before his death, Mudge was awarded £2,500 by a Committee of the House of Commons who decided for Mudge and against the Board of Longitude, then headed by Sir Joseph Banks.

In 1770 George III purchased a large gold watch produced by Mudge, that incorporated his lever escapement. This he presented to his wife, Queen Charlotte, and it still remains in the Royal Collection at Windsor Castle. In 1776 Mudge was appointed watchmaker to the king.

== Death ==
In 1789 his wife, Abigail, died. Thomas Mudge died at the home of his elder son, Thomas, at Newington Butts, South London on 14 November 1794. He was buried at St Dunstan-in-the-West, Fleet Street.

== Additional links ==
- Seccombe, Thomas (1894). "Mudge, Thomas" . In Lee, Sidney (ed.). Dictionary of National Biography. Vol. 39. London: Smith, Elder & Co. pp. 256–258.
