= Johann Mannhardt =

German clockmaker

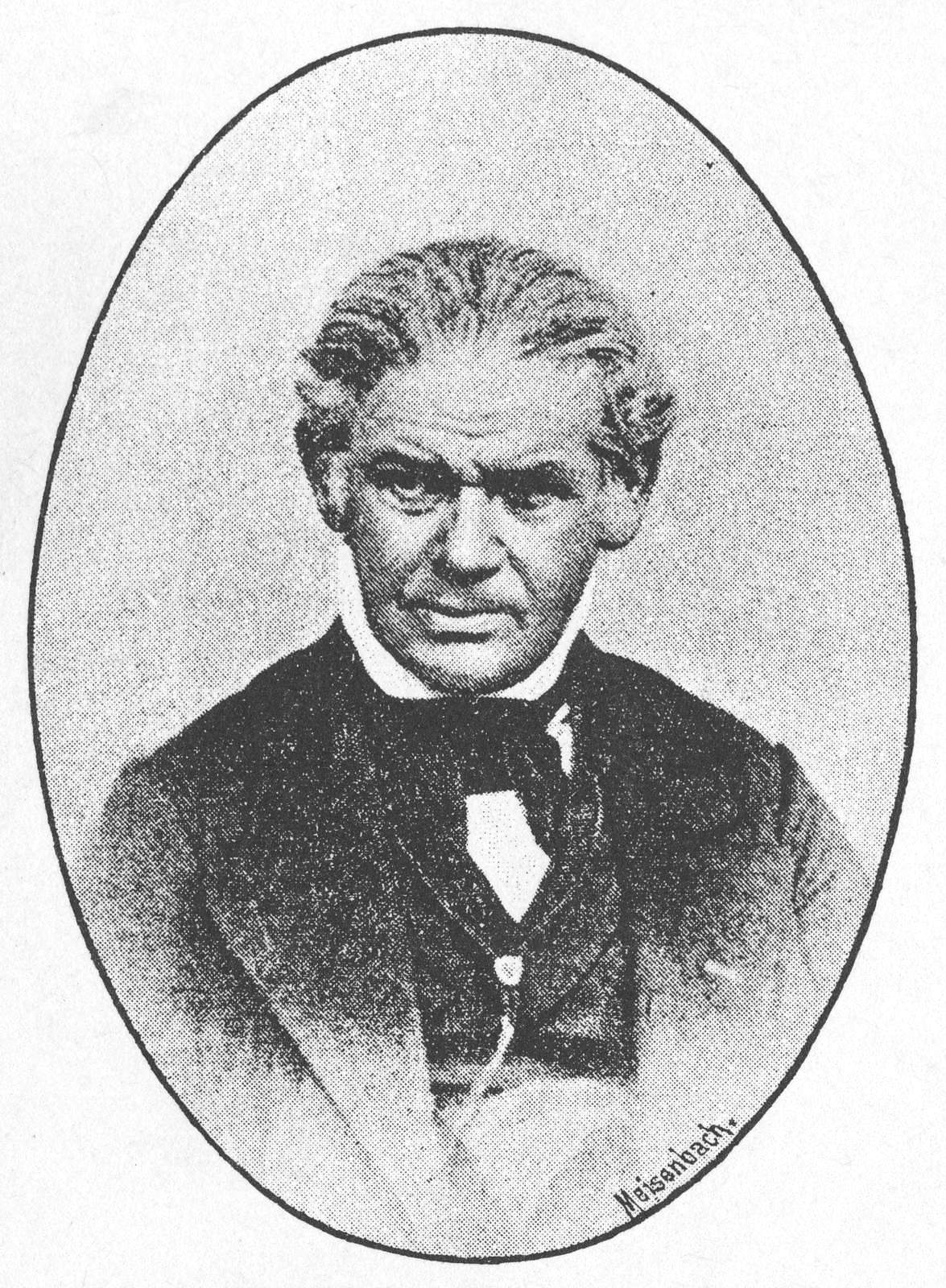
Johann Mannhardt.

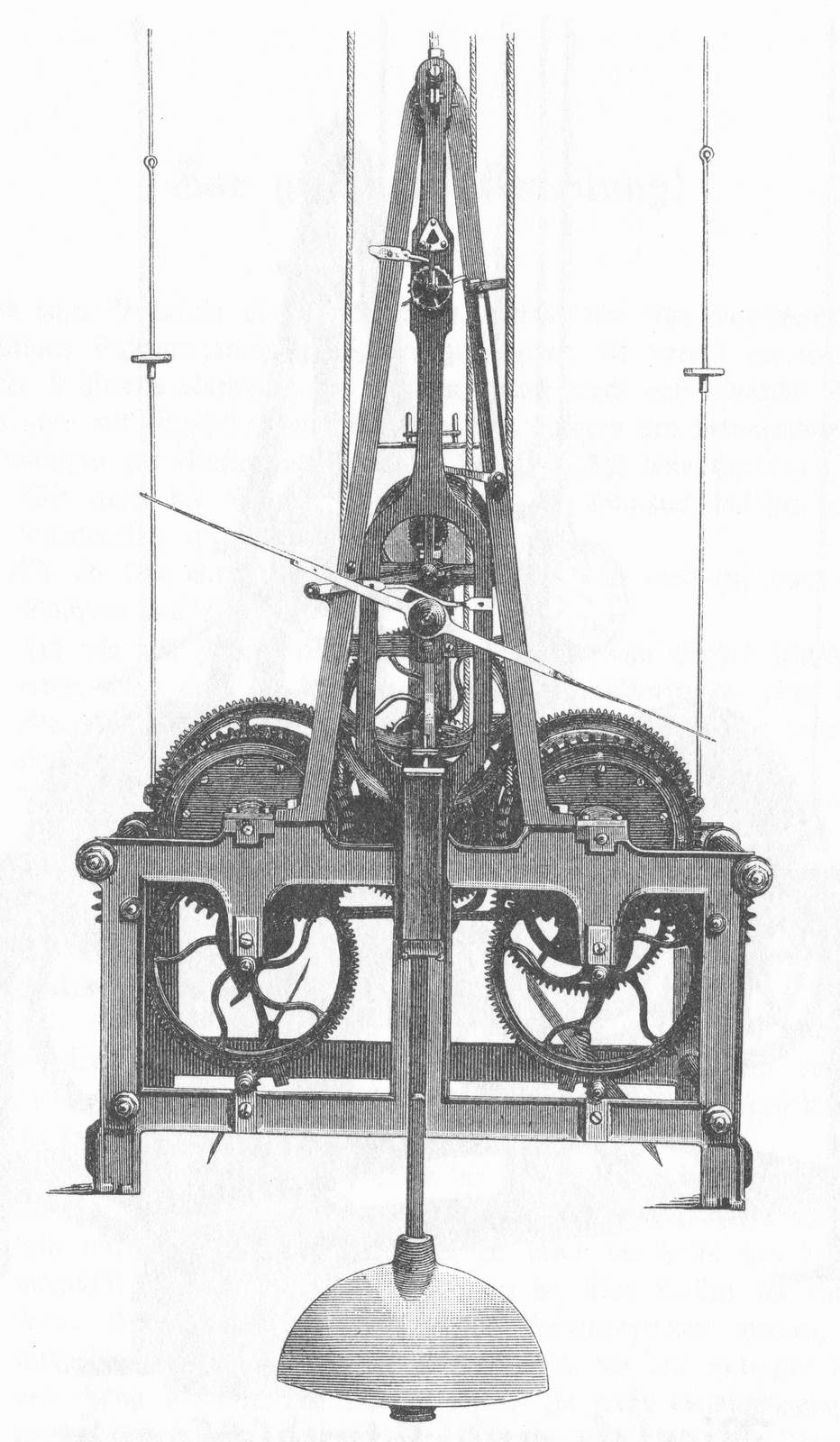
Clock designed by Mannhardt.

Johann Mannhardt (August 31, 1798 – August 25, 1878) was a German clockmaker, mechanic, and inventor.

Mannhardt was born in Tegernsee, and worked initially as a goatherd. He learned the clockmaking trade, however, and developed a strong talent for mechanical work. In 1826 he built a clock for the clocktower in Egern. In 1844 he moved to Munich, where he designed a new lead-sealing machine and oil mill, as well as the iron framings for the skylights on the roof of the Alte Pinakothek. He also built a number of machines, including saws, lathes, and peat presses, many of which he improved in ways that were copied elsewhere. In addition, he designed the guillotine that was used in Germany for carrying out the death penalty for the next hundred years or so.. Mannhardt continued to work at clockmaking as well, particularly turret clocks for clock towers, and equipped the clocktowers in a large number of European cities, as well as in the United States. He died in Munich in 1878.
