= Georges Frederic Roskopf =

Watchmaker (1813–1889)

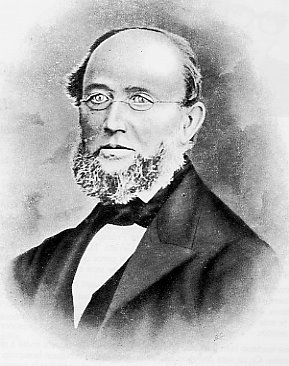
- Born: 15 March 1813; Germany
- Died: 14 April 1889 (aged 76)
- Citizenship: Swiss
- Occupation: watchmaker
- Known for: invented pin-pallet escapement

Georges Frederic Roskopf (15 March 1813 – 14 April 1889), the inventor of the pin-pallet escapement, was born in Germany and became a naturalized Swiss citizen.

== Early life and introduction ==
In 1829, when Roskopf was 16, he went to La Chaux-de-Fonds and began training in commerce with F. Mairet & Sandoz, who dealt in ironmongery and watch parts. In 1833 he decided to become a watchmaker and went as an apprentice to J. Biber, in La Chaux-de-Fonds, to learn watchmaking.

== Career as a watch maker and specialist ==
Financed by his wife, he then set up in business as an établisseur, that is, a watch producer who bought the ébauche and all other parts of the watch and assembled them. He made cylinder and lever watches for export to North America and Belgium. Although the watches were well made, the business was not profitable and in 1850 Roskopf sold it. In 1851 Roskopf became the joint manager of the La Chaux-de-Fonds branch of B. J. Guttman Frères of Wurzburg. They manufactured English-type watches. In 1855 he set up in business with his son, Fritz Edouard, and Henri Gindraux as "ROSKOPF, GINDRAUX & CO." After two years his son opened his own business in Geneva and Gindraux went to Neuchâtel to become the Director of the Watchmaking School.

Roskopf was an idealist who dreamed of making a good quality, cheap watch for working men. To accomplish this he used an old idea and reworked it, that of having the hands driven directly by the mainspring. In 1860 he began to design such a watch, which could be sold for 20 francs, and would still be of excellent quality, simple and solid. The watch had a large barrel in the centre, a "Perron" pin-pallet escapement, and a monometallic balance. After discussions with Moritz J. Grossman he adopted the simple detached pin lever escapement.

Listing of the features for the new calibre:

- 1 Escapement on a platform normally using a pin lever design but possible with a lever or cylinder escapement;
- 2. No centre wheel but a large barrel;
- 3. Motion work to hands direct from the barrel arbour;
- 4. Philippe free spring with no stop work;
- 5. Button wind but with handset by finger pressure.

== Parts refusal and patents ==
Roskopf met indifference and hostility among the watchmakers of the area who were still working as a home industry and who did not wish to make a watch such as he was offering. It is said, that in 1866 Roskopf ordered two boxes of ebauches from Emile Roulet and asked Gustave Rosselet to make escapements; both refused to take his orders because of the novelty of the work. He finally succeeded in producing a watch in 1867, using ebauches and cases from the Malleray Watch Co., and parts from many other makers, and having them assembled in Damprichard, Doubs, France, by M. Chatelain. The original order to Malleray Watch Co., was 2000 pieces. By the end of 1867 he was in business and by 1870 he had ordered 20,000 ebauches.

Roskopf was granted US patent No. 75,463 10 Mar. 1868, for a changeable escapement for watches (this patent said that the escapement could be adapted for use with a cylinder or lever as well as a pin pallet). Roskopf patented his watch in France with French patent No. 80611 of 25 Mar. 1868 for a watch with a type of platform escapement. He patented his designs in several countries (Belgium, No. 21988, 3 Aug. 1867) but never in Switzerland, because Switzerland did not yet have a patenting system, and because the idea had been used there before his use of it.

== Exhibitions and presentations ==
Through the influence of the House of Breguet in Paris, Roskopf was able to present his watch at the Universal Exhibition in Paris in 1868 and won a Bronze Medal. From then on Breguet began to send him orders. Some movements were supplied to Borel & Courvoisier. Other orders poured in. The Roskopf watch was exhibited at the Amsterdam Exhibition in 1869 and won a Silver Medal. In 1870 Georges Roskopf introduced a second design with a setting mechanism; this watch cost 25 francs. In it he reduced the number of parts, simplified the escapement fitting, and introduced an improved winding. The escapement was assembled on its own adjustable platform. The watch was SW and pin-set. In his oversize barrel he arranged to use Adrien Philippe’s (Patek Philippe) patent-free mainspring without stop works for which he paid a royalty on each watch.

== Later career and death ==
In 1873 Roskopf handed over his business to Wille Frères and their associates, Ch. Léon Schmid.

When Roskopf died in 1889 a number of firms claimed to be his true successors. But Wille Frères actually owned the rights on the company. Actually, Wille Frères and Vve Ch. L. Schmid had been using Roskopf trade mark for years before G. F. Roskopf’s death, with his permission.

By this time the idea of the Roskopf-type watch was becoming popular in Switzerland and a number of Swiss companies began making "Roskopf" watches. In order to be really cheap, the watches had to be machine mass manufactured as much as possible. These watches had pin-pallet escapements rather than platform escapements.

== See also ==
- Pin-pallet escapement
- Lever escapement
- Mechanical watch
- Cimier
