= History of timekeeping devices =

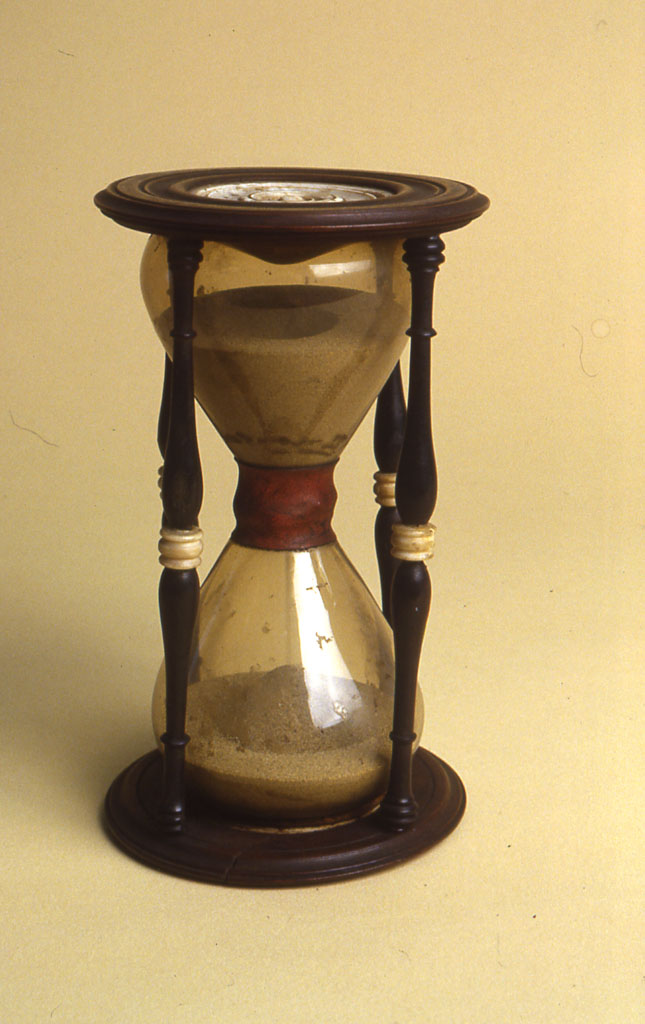
A 17th-century sand hourglass. The hourglass is nowadays often used symbolically to represent the concept of time.

The history of timekeeping devices dates back to when ancient civilizations first observed astronomical bodies as they moved across the sky. Devices and methods for keeping time have gradually improved through a series of new inventions, starting with measuring time by continuous processes, such as the flow of liquid in water clocks, to mechanical clocks, and eventually repetitive, oscillatory processes, such as the swing of pendulums. Oscillating timekeepers are used in modern timepieces. Sundials and water clocks were first used in ancient Egypt c. 1200 BC and later by the Babylonians, the Greeks and the Chinese. Incense clocks were being used in China by the 6th century. In the medieval period, Islamic water clocks were unrivalled in their sophistication until the mid-14th century. The hourglass, invented in Europe, was one of the few reliable methods of measuring time at sea.

In medieval Europe, purely mechanical clocks were developed after the invention of the bell-striking alarm, used to signal the correct time to ring monastic bells. The weight-driven mechanical clock controlled by the action of a verge and foliot was a synthesis of earlier ideas from European and Islamic science. Mechanical clocks were a major breakthrough, one notably designed and built by Henry de Vick in c. 1360, which established basic clock design for the next 300 years. Minor developments were added, such as the invention of the mainspring in the early 15th century, which allowed small clocks to be built for the first time.

The next major improvement in clock building, from the 17th century, was the discovery that clocks could be controlled by harmonic oscillators. Leonardo da Vinci had produced the earliest known drawings of a pendulum in 1493–1494, and in 1582 Galileo Galilei had investigated the regular swing of the pendulum, discovering that frequency was only dependent on length, not weight. The pendulum clock, designed and built by Dutch polymath Christiaan Huygens in 1656, was so much more accurate than other kinds of mechanical timekeepers that few verge and foliot mechanisms have survived. Other innovations in timekeeping during this period include inventions for striking clocks, the repeating clock and the deadbeat escapement.

Error factors in early pendulum clocks included temperature variation, a problem tackled during the 18th century by the English clockmakers John Harrison and George Graham. Following the Scilly naval disaster of 1707, after which governments offered a prize to anyone who could discover a way to determine longitude, Harrison built a succession of accurate timepieces, introducing the term chronometer. The electric clock, invented in 1840, was used to control the most accurate pendulum clocks until the 1940s, when quartz timers became the basis for the precise measurement of time and frequency. The wristwatch, which had been recognised as a valuable military tool during the Boer War, became popular after World War I, in variations including non-magnetic, battery-driven, and solar powered, with quartz, transistors and plastic parts all introduced. Since the early 2010s, smartphones and smartwatches have become the most common timekeeping devices. The most accurate timekeeping devices in practical use today are atomic clocks, which can be accurate to a few billionths of a second per year and are used to calibrate other clocks and timekeeping instruments.

== Continuous timekeeping devices ==
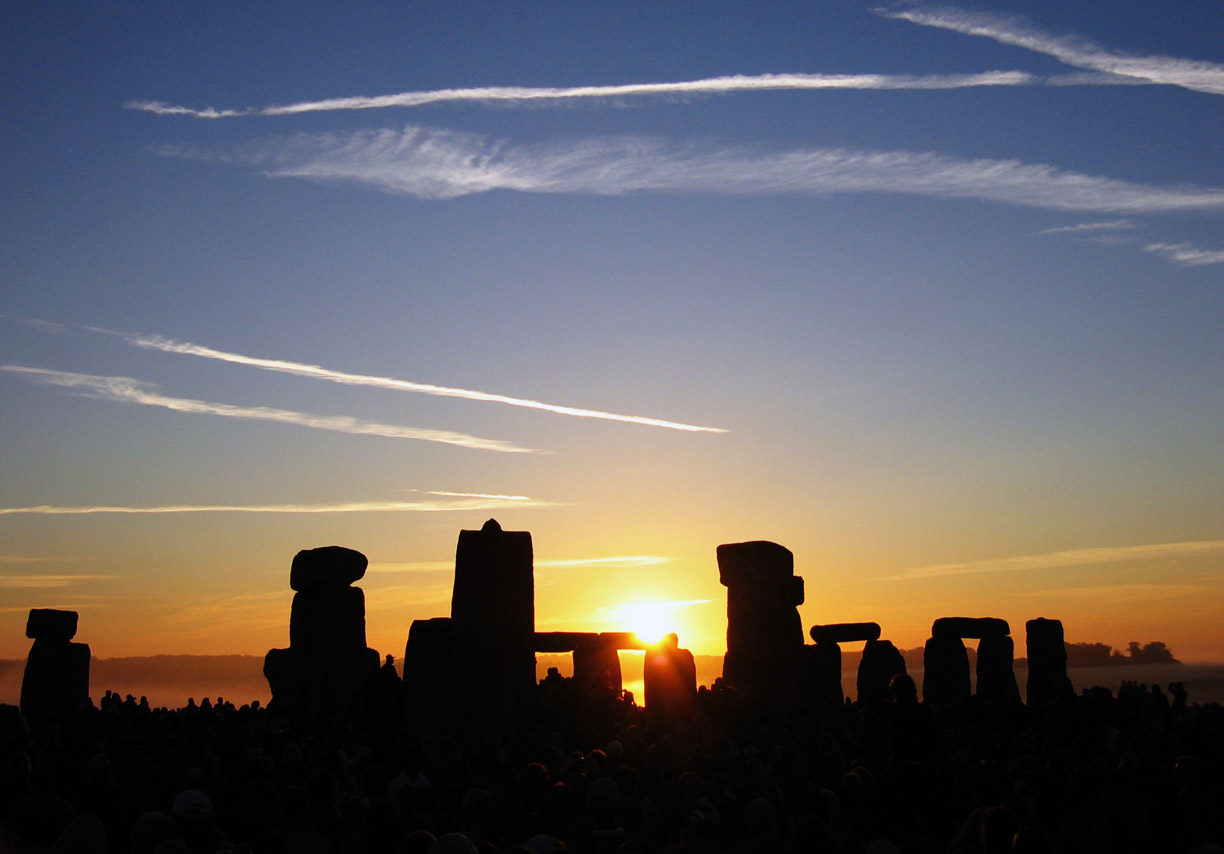
The Sun rising over Stonehenge in southern England on the June solstice (the longest day of the year in the Northern Hemisphere)

Ancient civilizations observed astronomical bodies, often the Sun and Moon, to determine time. According to the historian Eric Bruton, Stonehenge is likely to have been the Stone Age equivalent of an astronomical observatory, used for seasonal and annual events such as equinoxes or solstices. As megalithic civilizations left no recorded history, little is known of their timekeeping methods. The Warren Field calendar monument in Scotland is currently considered to be the oldest lunisolar calendar yet found.

Mesoamericans modified their usual vigesimal (base-20) counting system when dealing with calendars to produce a 360-day year. Aboriginal Australians understood the movement of objects in the sky well, and used their knowledge to construct calendars and aid navigation; most Aboriginal cultures had seasons that were well-defined and determined by natural changes throughout the year, including celestial events. Lunar phases were used to mark shorter periods of time; the Yaraldi of South Australia being one of the few people recorded as having a way to measure time during the day, which was divided into seven parts using the position of the Sun.

All timekeepers before the 13th century relied upon methods that used something that moved continuously. No early method of keeping time changed at a steady rate. Devices and methods for keeping time have improved continuously through a long series of new inventions and ideas.

=== Shadow clocks and sundials ===
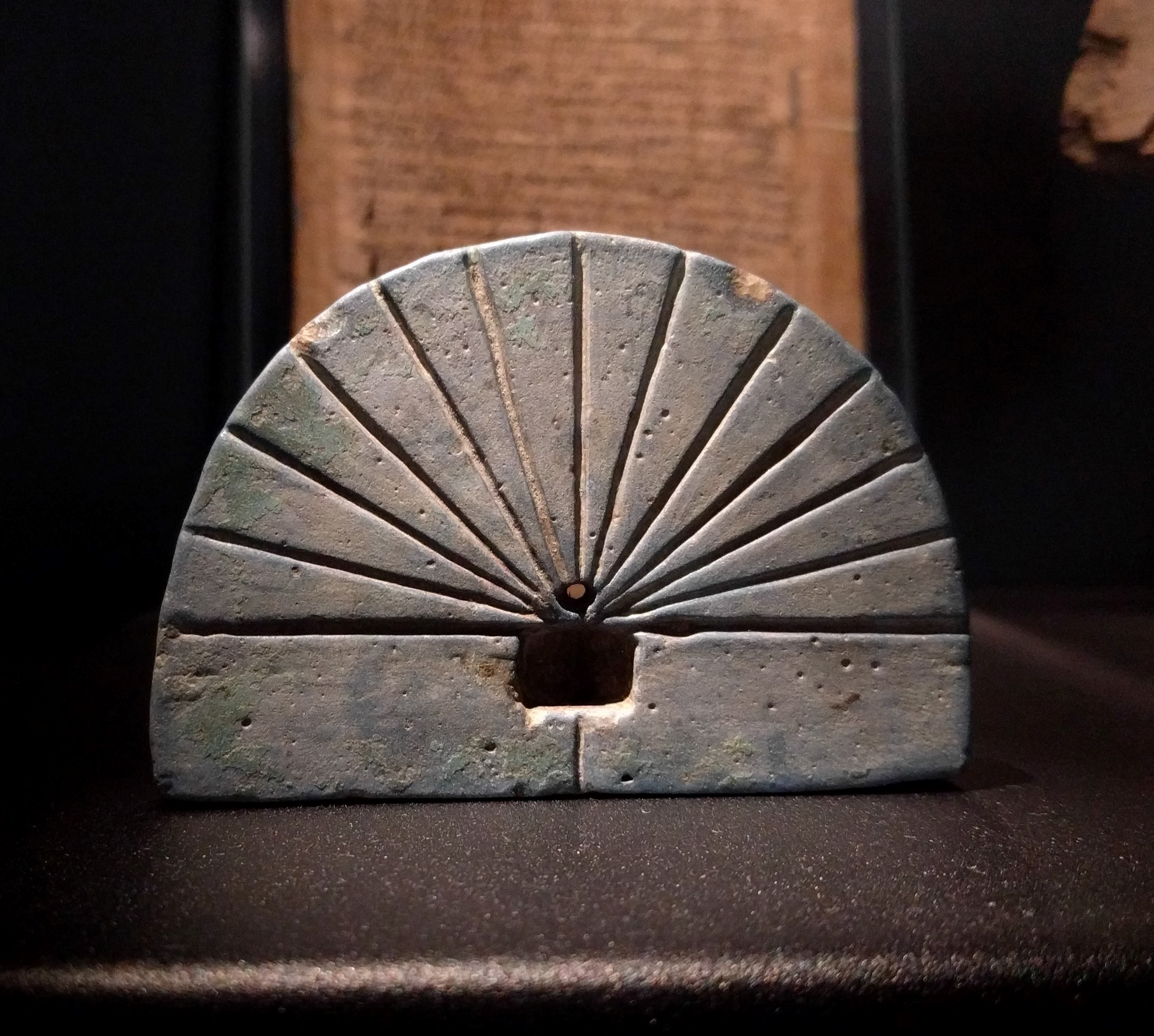
An Ancient Egyptian sundial (Rijksmuseum van Oudheden, Leiden)

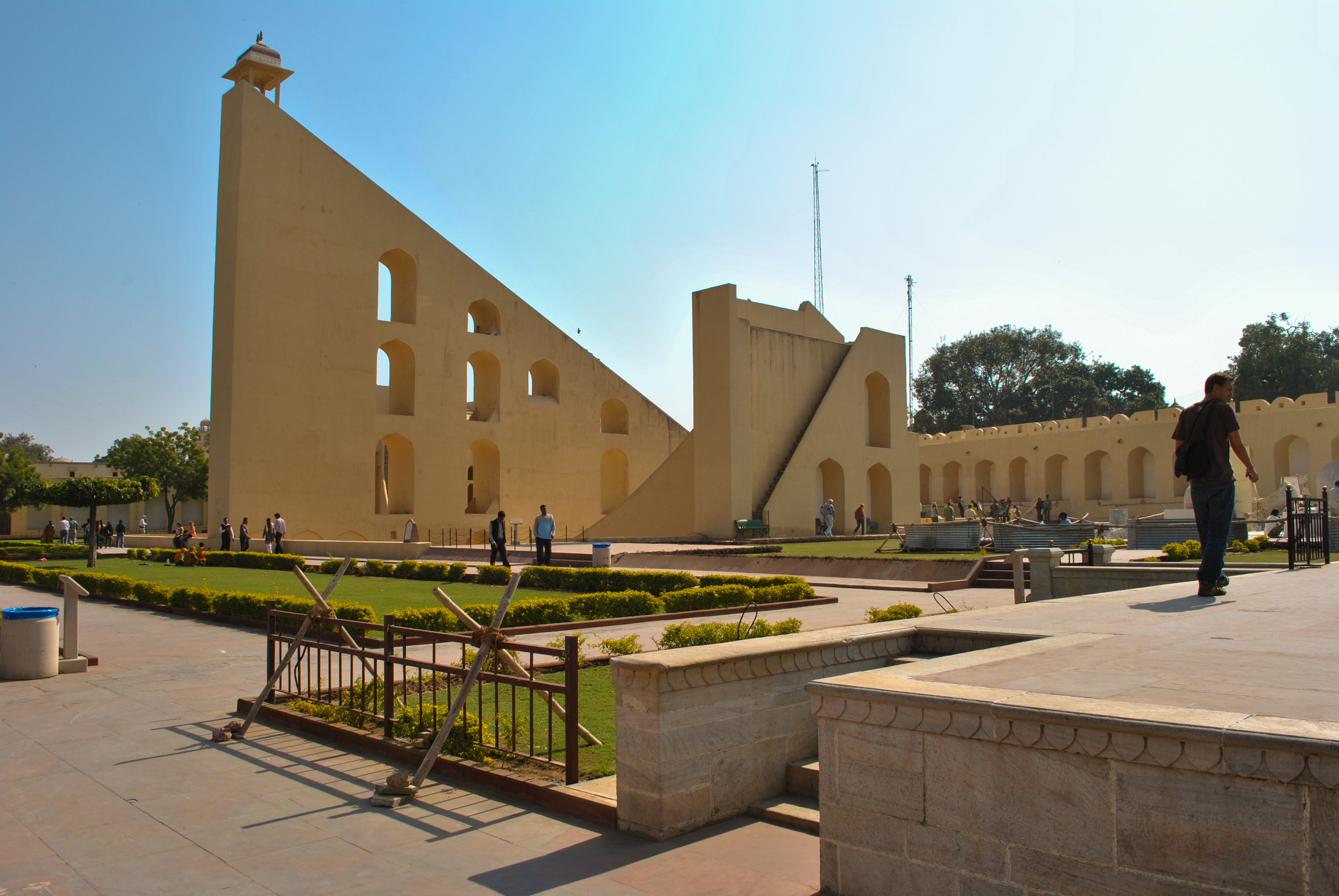
Vrihat Samrat Yantra, 88 feet (27 m) tall sundial at the Jantar Mantar in Jaipur, India. Built in 1727

The first devices used for measuring the position of the Sun were shadow clocks, which later developed into the sundial. (Note: The inventor of the quartz clock, Warren Marrison, noted that the sundial is not a timekeeping device, as it could only "at best keep local solar time".) The oldest known sundial dates back to c. 1200 BC (during the 19th Dynasty), and was discovered in the Valley of the Kings in 2013. Obelisks could indicate whether it was morning or afternoon, as well as the summer and winter solstices. A kind of shadow clock was developed c. 500 BC that was similar in shape to a bent T-square. It measured the passage of time by the shadow cast by its crossbar, and was oriented eastward in the mornings, and turned around at noon, so it could cast its shadow in the opposite direction.

A sundial is referred to in the Bible, in 2 Kings 20:9–11, when Hezekiah, king of Judea during the 8th century BC, is recorded as being healed by the prophet Isaiah and asks for a sign that he would recover:

And Isaiah said, This sign shalt thou have of the Lord, that the Lord will do the thing that he hath spoken: shall the shadow go forward ten degrees, or go back ten degrees? And Hezekiah answered, It is a light thing for the shadow to go down ten degrees: nay, but let the shadow return backward ten degrees. And Isaiah the prophet cried unto the Lord: and he brought the shadow ten degrees backward, by which it had gone down in the dial of Ahaz.

A clay tablet from the late Babylonian period describes the lengths of shadows at different times of the year. The Babylonian writer Berossos (fl. 3rd century BC) is credited by the Greeks with the invention of a hemispherical sundial hollowed out of stone; the path of the shadow was divided into 12 parts to mark the time. Greek sundials evolved to become highly sophisticated—Ptolemy's Analemma, written in the 2nd century AD, used an early form of trigonometry to derive the position of the Sun from data such as the hour of day and the geographical latitude. (Note: A verse by Plautus (c. 254 – 184 BC) shows that sundials were familiar to the Romans: The gods confound the man who first found out How to distinguish hours! Confound him too, Who in this place set up a sundial, To cut and hack my days so wretchedly Into small portions—When I was a boy, My belly was my sun-dial: one more sure, Truer, and more exact than any of them. This dial told me when 'twas proper time To go to dinner, when I had aught to eat— But now-a-days, why, even when I have, I can't fall to, unless the sun gives leave. The town's so full of these confounded dials, The greatest part of its inhabitants Shrunk up with hunger, creep along the streets.)

The Romans inherited the sundial from the Greeks. The first sundial in Rome arrived in 264 BC, looted from Catania in Sicily. This sundial offered the innovation of the hours of the "horologium" throughout the day where before the Romans simply split the day into early morning and forenoon (mane and ante merididiem). Still, there were unexpected astronomical challenges; this clock gave the incorrect time for a century. This mistake was noticed only in 164 BC, when the Roman censor came to check and adjusted for the appropriate latitude.

According to the German historian of astronomy Ernst Zinner, sundials were developed during the 13th century with scales that showed equal hours. The first based on polar time appeared in Germany c. 1400; an alternative theory proposes that a Damascus sundial measuring in polar time can be dated to 1372. European treatises on sundial design appeared c. 1500.

An Egyptian method of determining the time during the night, used from at least 600 BC, was a type of plumb-line called a merkhet. A north–south meridian was created using two merkhets aligned with Polaris, the north pole star. The time was determined by observing particular stars as they crossed the meridian.

The Jantar Mantar in Jaipur built in 1727 by Jai Singh II includes the Vrihat Samrat Yantra, 88 feet (27 m) tall sundial. It can tell local time to an accuracy of about two seconds.

=== Water clocks ===
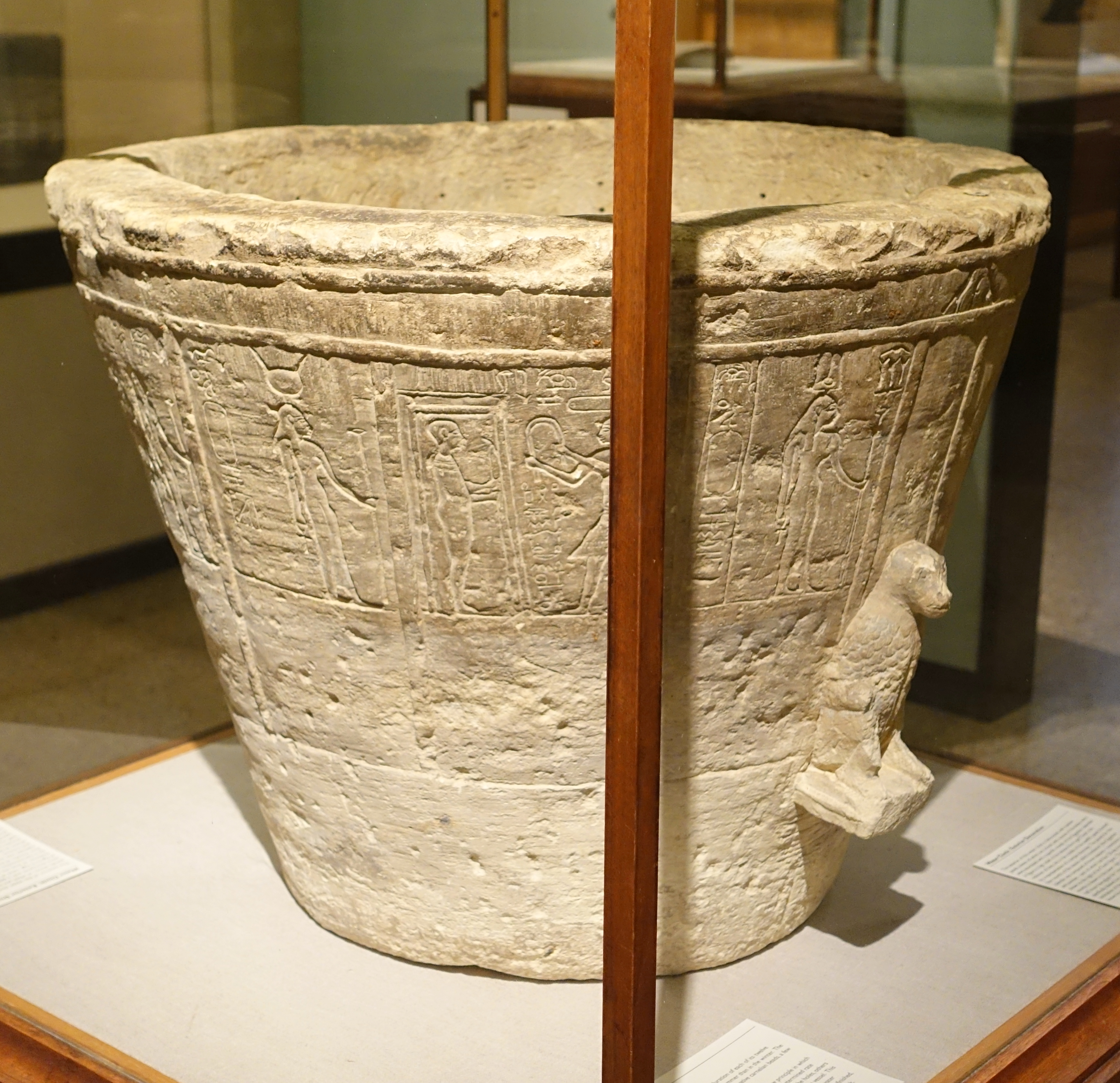
A limestone Egyptian water clock, 285–246 BC (Oriental Institute, Chicago)

The oldest description of a clepsydra, or water clock, is from the tomb inscription of an early 18th Dynasty (c. 1500 BC) Egyptian court official named Amenemhet, who is identified as its inventor. It is assumed that the object described on the inscription is a bowl with markings to indicate the time. The oldest surviving water clock was found in the tomb of pharaoh Amenhotep III (c. 1417–1379 BC). There are no recognised examples in existence of outflowing water clocks from ancient Mesopotamia, but written references have survived.

The introduction of the water clock to China, perhaps from Mesopotamia, occurred as far back as the 2nd millennium BC, during the Shang dynasty, and at the latest by the 1st millennium BC. Around 550 AD, Yin Kui (殷蘷) was the first in China to write of the overflow or constant-level tank in his book "Lou ke fa (漏刻法)". Around 610, two Sui dynasty inventors, Geng Xun (耿詢) and Yuwen Kai (宇文愷), created the first balance clepsydra, with standard positions for the steelyard balance. In 721 the mathematician Yi Xing and government official Liang Lingzan regulated the power of the water driving an astronomical clock, dividing the power into unit impulses so that motion of the planets and stars could be duplicated. In 976, the Song dynasty astronomer Zhang Sixun addressed the problem of the water in clepsydrae freezing in cold weather when he replaced the water with liquid mercury. A water-powered astronomical clock tower was built by the polymath Su Song in 1088, which featured the first known endless power-transmitting chain drive.

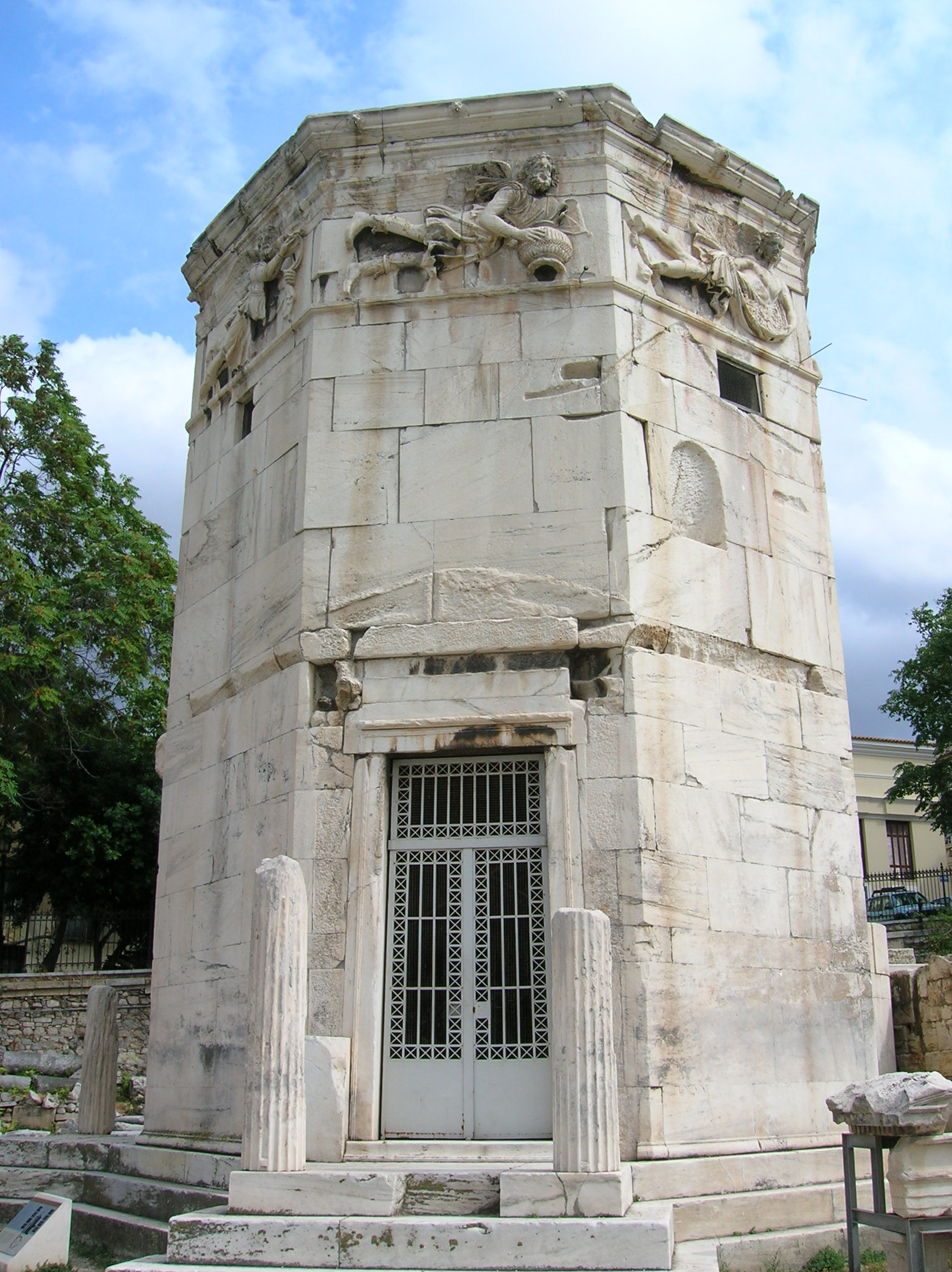
The Tower of the Winds in Athens (1st century BC)

The Greek philosophers Anaxagoras and Empedocles both referred to water clocks that were used to enforce time limits or measure the passing of time. The Athenian philosopher Plato is supposed to have invented an alarm clock that used lead balls cascading noisily onto a copper platter to wake his students.

A problem with most clepsydrae was the variation in the flow of water due to the change in fluid pressure, which was addressed from 100 BC when the clock's water container was given a conical shape. They became more sophisticated when innovations such as gongs and moving mechanisms were included. There is strong evidence that the 1st century BC Tower of the Winds in Athens once had a water clock, and a wind vane, as well as the nine vertical sundials still visible on the outside. In Greek tradition, clepsydrae were used in court, a practise later adopted by the Ancient Romans.

Ibn Khalaf al-Muradi in medieval Al-Andalus described a water clock that employed both segmental and epicyclic gearing. Islamic water clocks, which used complex gear trains and included arrays of automata, were unrivalled in their sophistication until the mid-14th century. Liquid-driven mechanisms (using heavy floats and a constant-head system) were developed that enabled water clocks to work at a slower rate. Some have argued that the first known geared clock was rather invented by the great mathematician, physicist, and engineer Archimedes during the 3rd century BC. Archimedes created his astronomical clock, which was also a cuckoo clock with birds singing and moving every hour. It is the first carillon clock as it plays music simultaneously with a person blinking his eyes, surprised by the singing birds. The Archimedes clock works with a system of four weights, counterweights, and strings regulated by a system of floats in a water container with siphons that regulate the automatic continuation of the clock. The principles of this type of clock are described by the mathematician and physicist Hero, who says that some of them work with a chain that turns a gear in the mechanism.

The 12th-century Jayrun Water Clock at the Umayyad Mosque in Damascus was constructed by Muhammad al-Sa'ati, and was later described by his son Ridwan ibn al-Sa'ati in his On the Construction of Clocks and their Use (1203). A sophisticated water-powered astronomical clock was described by Al-Jazari in his treatise on machines, written in 1206. This castle clock was about 11 feet (3.4 m) high. In 1235, a water-powered clock that "announced the appointed hours of prayer and the time both by day and by night" stood in the entrance hall of the Mustansiriya Madrasah in Baghdad.

=== Chinese incense clocks ===
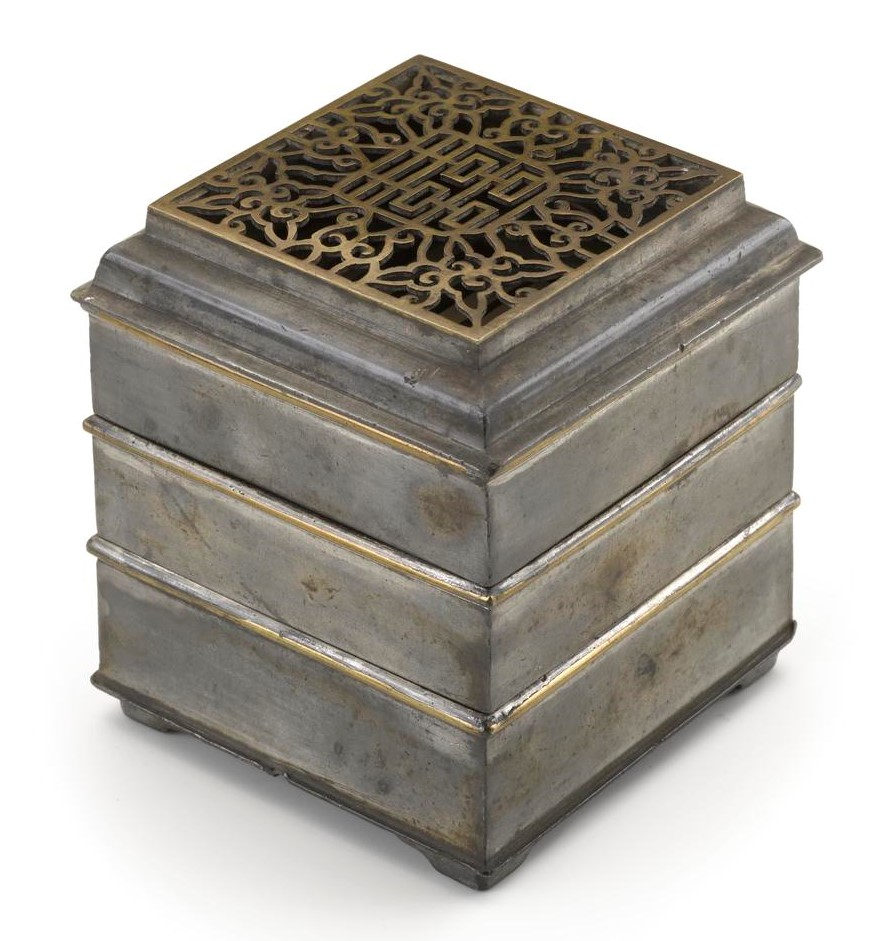
An incense clock; time was measured by means of powdered incense burnt along a pre-measured path

Incense clocks were first used in China around the 6th century, mainly for religious purposes, but also for social gatherings or by scholars. Due to their frequent use of Devanagari characters, American sinologist Edward H. Schafer has speculated that incense clocks were invented in India. As incense burns evenly and without a flame, the clocks were safe for indoor use. To mark different hours, differently scented incenses (made from different recipes) were used.

The incense sticks used could be straight or spiralled; the spiralled ones were intended for long periods of use, and often hung from the roofs of homes and temples. Some clocks were designed to drop weights at even intervals.

Incense seal clocks had a disk etched with one or more grooves, into which incense was placed. The length of the trail of incense, directly related to the size of the seal, was the primary factor in determining how long the clock would last; to burn 12 hours an incense path of around 20 metres (66 ft) has been estimated. The gradual introduction of metal disks, most likely beginning during the Song dynasty, allowed craftsmen to more easily create seals of different sizes, design and decorate them more aesthetically, and vary the paths of the grooves, to allow for the changing length of the days in the year. As smaller seals became available, incense seal clocks grew in popularity and were often given as gifts.

=== Astrolabes ===
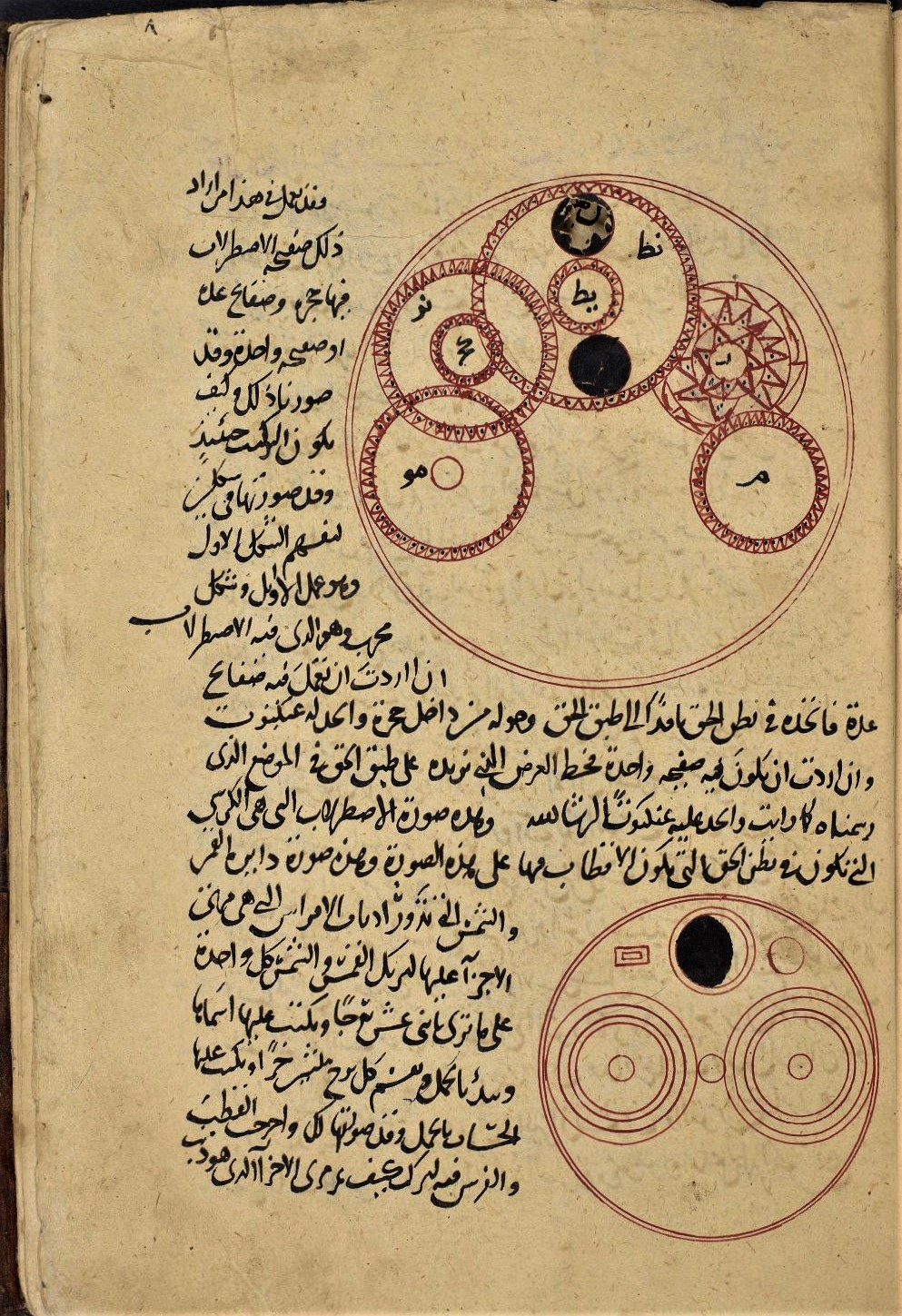
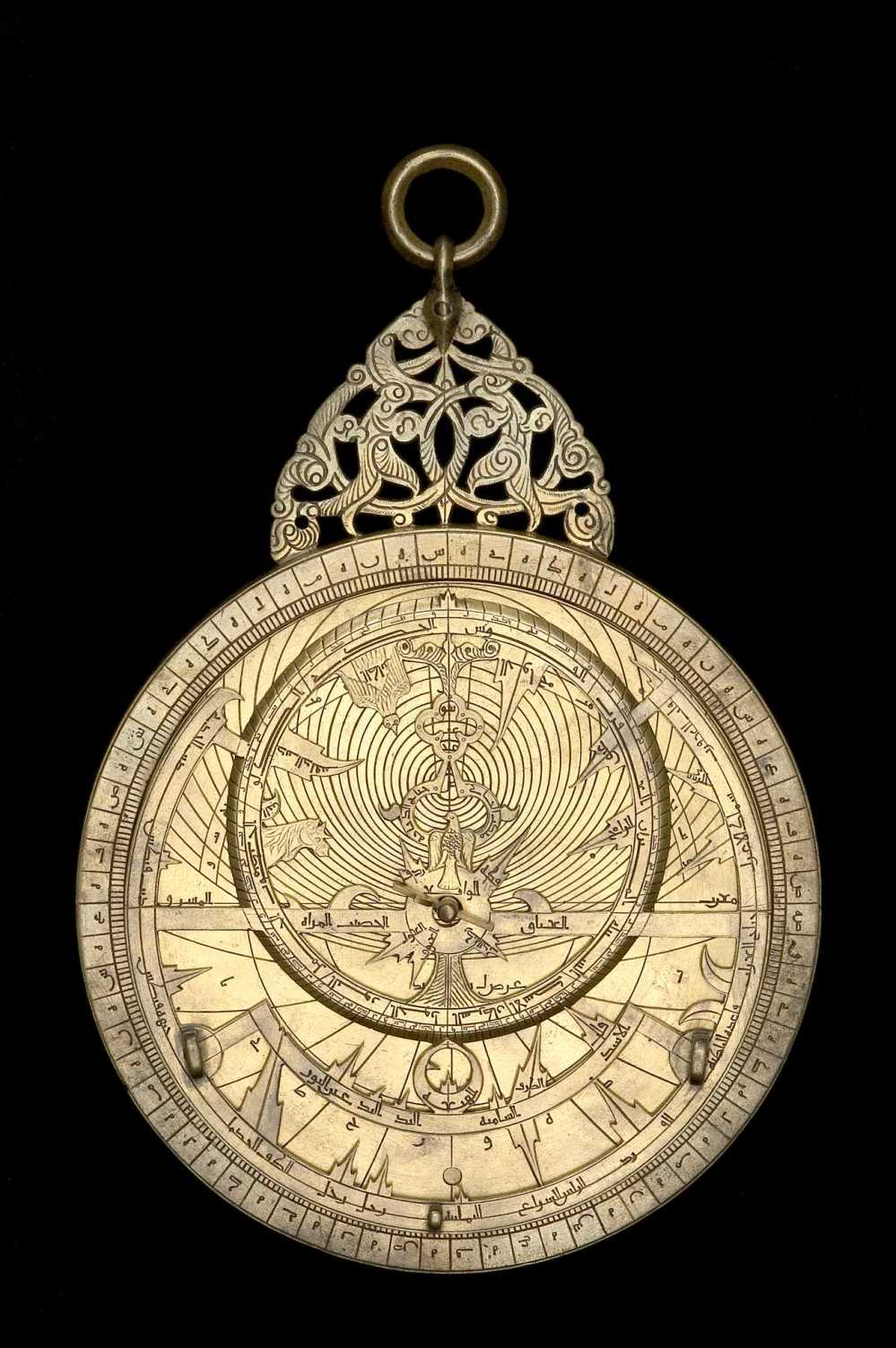
(left) al-Bīrūnī's 11th-century description of a geared astrolabe; (right) the astrolabe made in c. 1221 by the astronomer al‐Farisi (History of Science Museum, Oxford)

Sophisticated timekeeping astrolabes with geared mechanisms were made in Persia. Examples include those built by the polymath Abū Rayhān Bīrūnī in the 11th century and the astronomer Muhammad ibn Abi Bakr al‐Farisi in c.1221. A brass and silver astrolabe (which also acts as a calendar) made in Isfahan by al‐Farisi is the earliest surviving machine with its gears still intact. Openings on the back of the astrolabe depict the lunar phases and gives the Moon's age; within a zodiacal scale are two concentric rings that show the relative positions of the Sun and the Moon.

Muslim astronomers constructed a variety of highly accurate astronomical clocks for use in their mosques and observatories, such as the astrolabic clock by Ibn al-Shatir in the early 14th century.

=== Candle clocks and hourglasses ===
One of the earliest references to a candle clock is in a Chinese poem, written in 520 by You Jianfu, who wrote of the graduated candle being a means of determining time at night. Similar candles were used in Japan until the early 10th century.

The invention of the candle clock was attributed by the Anglo-Saxons to Alfred the Great, king of Wessex (r. 871–889), who used six candles marked at intervals of one inch (25 mm), each made from 12 pennyweights of wax, and made to be 12 centimetres (4.7 in) in height and of a uniform thickness.

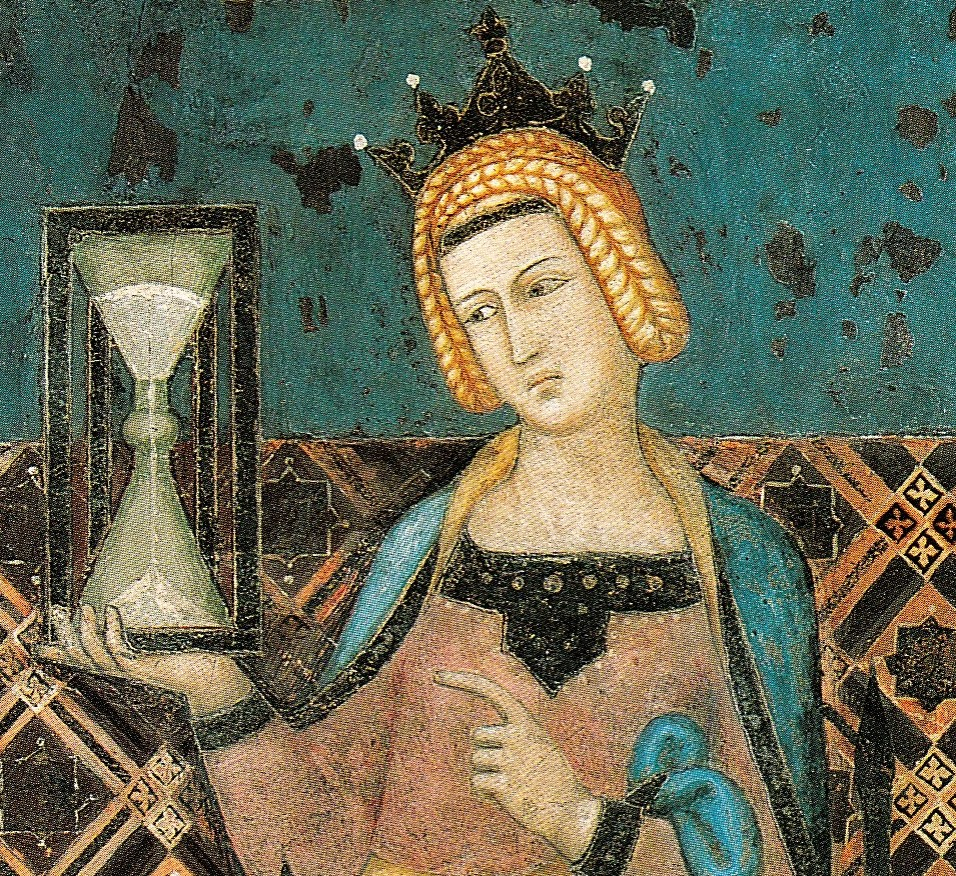
A detail from Ambrogio Lorenzetti's Allegory of Good Government (c. 1338), showing an hourglass in use

The 12th-century Muslim inventor Al-Jazari described four different designs for a candle clock in his book Book of Knowledge of Ingenious Mechanical Devices. His so-called "scribe" candle clock was invented to mark the passing of 14 hours of equal length: a precisely engineered mechanism caused a candle of specific dimensions to be slowly pushed upwards, which caused an indicator to move along a scale.

The hourglass was one of the few reliable methods of measuring time at sea, and it has been speculated that it was used on board ships as far back as the 11th century, when it would have complemented the compass as an aid to navigation. The earliest unambiguous evidence of the use of an hourglass appears in the painting Allegory of Good Government, by the Italian artist Ambrogio Lorenzetti, from 1338.

The Portuguese navigator Ferdinand Magellan used 18 hourglasses on each ship during his circumnavigation of the globe in 1522. Though used in China, the hourglass's history there is unknown, but does not seem to have been used before the mid-16th century, as the hourglass implies the use of glassblowing, then an entirely European and Western art.

From the 15th century onwards, hourglasses were used in a wide range of applications at sea, in churches, in industry, and in cooking; they were the first dependable, reusable, reasonably accurate, and easily constructed time-measurement devices. The hourglass took on symbolic meanings, such as that of death, temperance, opportunity, and Father Time, usually represented as a bearded, old man.

== History of early oscillating devices in timekeepers ==
The English word clock first appeared in Middle English as clok, cloke, or clokke. The origin of the word is not known for certain; it may be a borrowing from French or Dutch, and can perhaps be traced to the post-classical Latin clocca ('bell'). 7th-century Irish and 9th-century Germanic sources recorded clock as meaning 'bell'.

Judaism, Christianity and Islam all had times set aside for prayer, although Christians alone were expected to attend prayers at specific hours of the day and night; what the historian Jo Ellen Barnett describes as "a rigid adherence to repetitive prayers said many times a day". The bell-striking alarms warned the monk on duty to toll the monastic bell. His alarm was a timer that used a form of escapement to ring a small bell. This mechanism was the forerunner of the escapement device found in the mechanical clock.

=== 13th century ===
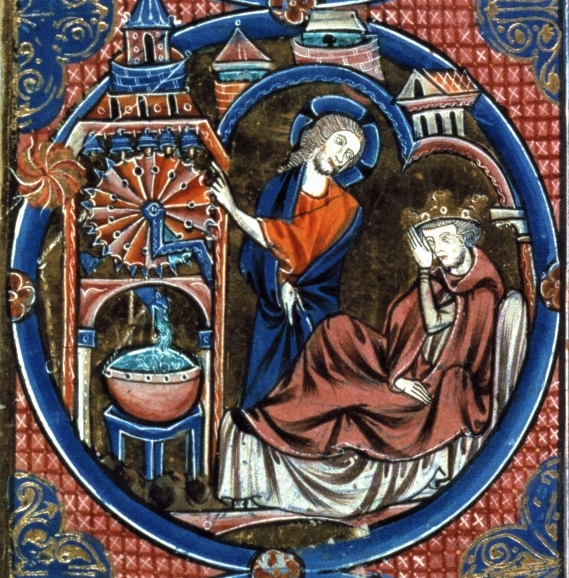
Water clock (representing a clock at the royal court in Paris, c.1250)

The first innovations to improve on the accuracy of the hourglass and the water clock occurred in the 10th century, when attempts were made to slow their rate of flow using friction or the force of gravity. The earliest depiction of a clock powered by a hanging weight is from the Bible of St Louis, an illuminated manuscript made between 1226 and 1234 that shows a clock being slowed by water acting on a wheel. The illustration seems to show that weight-driven clocks were invented in western Europe. A treatise written by Robertus Anglicus in 1271 shows that medieval craftsmen were attempting to design a purely mechanical clock (i.e. only driven by gravity) during this period. Such clocks were a synthesis of earlier ideas derived from European and Islamic science, such as gearing systems, weight drives, and striking mechanisms.

In 1250, the artist Villard de Honnecourt illustrated a device that was the step towards the development of the escapement. Another forerunner of the escapement was the horologia nocturna, which used an early kind of verge mechanism to operate a knocker that continuously struck a bell. The weight-driven clock was probably a Western European invention, as a picture of a clock shows a weight pulling an axle around, its motion slowed by a system of holes that slowly released water. In 1271, the English astronomer Robertus Anglicus wrote of his contemporaries that they were in the process of developing a form of mechanical clock. (Note: Nor is it possible for any clock to follow the judgment of astronomy with complete accuracy. Yet clockmakers are trying to make a wheel which will make one complete revolution for every one of the equinoctial circle, but they cannot quite perfect their work. (Latin: Nec est hoc possibile, quod aliquod horologium sequatur omnino iudicium astronomie secundum veritatem. Conantur tamen artifices horologiorum facere circulum unum qui omnino moveatur secundum motum circuli equinoctialis, sed non possunt omnino complere opus eorum, quod, si possent facere, esset horologium verax valde et valeret plus quam astrolabium quantum ad horas capiendas vel aliud instrumentum astronomie, si quis hoc sciret facere secundum modum antedictum.))

=== 14th century ===
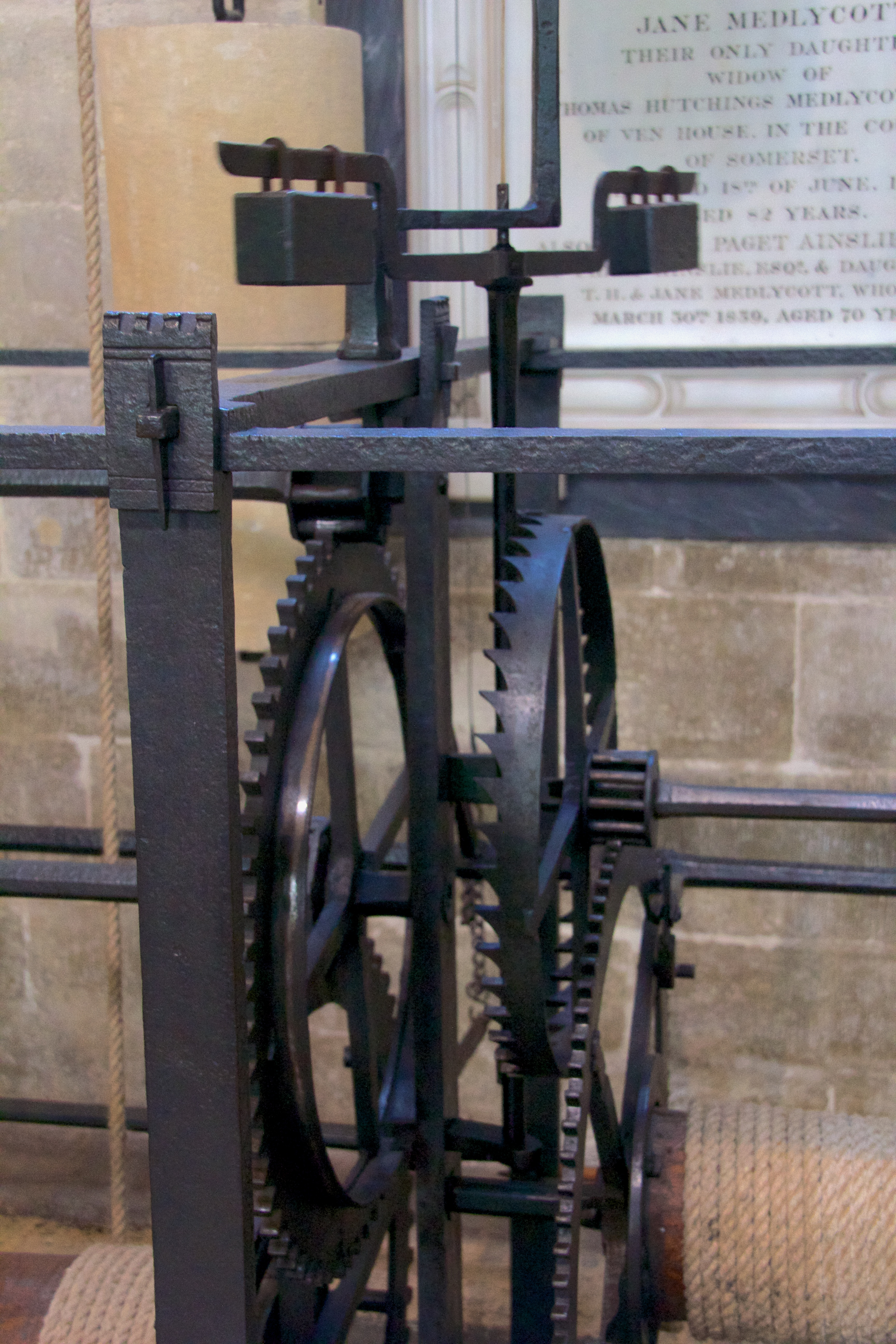
A detail of the Salisbury Cathedral clock, showing the verge and foliot

The invention of the verge and foliot escapement in c.1275 was one of the most important inventions in both the history of the clock and the history of technology. It was the first type of regulator in horology. A verge, or vertical shaft, is forced to rotate by a weight-driven crown wheel, but is stopped from rotating freely by a foliot. The foliot, which cannot vibrate freely, swings back and forth, which allows a wheel to rotate one tooth at a time. Although the verge and foliot was an advancement on previous timekeepers, it was impossible to avoid fluctuations in the beat caused by changes in the applied forces—the earliest mechanical clocks were regularly reset using a sundial.

At around the same time as the invention of the escapement, the Florentine poet Dante Alighieri used clock imagery to depict the souls of the blessed in Paradiso, the third part of the Divine Comedy, written in the early part of the 14th century. It may be the first known literary description of a mechanical clock. There are references to house clocks from 1314 onwards; by 1325 the development of the mechanical clock can be assumed to have occurred.

Large mechanical clocks were built that were mounted in towers so as to ring the bell directly. The tower clock of Norwich Cathedral constructed c. 1273 (reference to a payment for a mechanical clock dated to this year) is the earliest such large clock known. The clock has not survived. The first clock known to strike regularly on the hour, a clock with a verge and foliot mechanism, is recorded in Milan in 1336. By 1341, clocks driven by weights were familiar enough to be able to be adapted for grain mills, and by 1344 the clock in London's Old St Paul's Cathedral had been replaced by one with an escapement. The foliot was first illustrated by Dondi in 1364, and mentioned by the court historian Jean Froissart in 1369.

The most famous example of a timekeeping device during the medieval period was a clock designed and built by the clockmaker Henry de Vick c.1360, which was said to have varied by up to two hours a day. For the next 300 years, all the improvements in timekeeping were essentially developments based on the principles of de Vick's clock. Between 1348 and 1364, Giovanni Dondi dell'Orologio, the son of Jacopo Dondi, built a complex astrarium in Florence. (Note: Giovanni de Dondi's work has been replicated based on the designs. His clock was a seven-faced construction with 107 moving parts, showing the positions of the Sun, Moon, and five planets, as well as religious feast days. His clock has inspired several modern replicas, including some in London's Science Museum and the Smithsonian Institution.)

During the 14th century, striking clocks appeared with increasing frequency in public spaces, first in Italy, slightly later in France and England—between 1371 and 1380, public clocks were introduced in over 70 European cities. Salisbury Cathedral clock, dating from about 1386, is one of the oldest working clocks in the world, and may be the oldest; it still has most of its original parts. (Note: The original verge and foliot timekeeping mechanism for the Salisbury Cathedral clock is lost, having been converted to a pendulum, which was replaced by a replica verge in 1956. It has no dial, as its purpose was to strike a bell. The wheels and gears are mounted in a 1.2 metres (3 ft 11 in) iron frame, held together with metal dowels and pegs. Two large stones supply the power, and cause ropes to unwind from wooden barrels. The barrels drive the main wheel (regulated by the escapement), and the striking mechanism and air brake.) The Wells Cathedral clock, built in 1392, is unique in that it still has its original medieval face. Above the clock are figures which hit the bells, and a set of jousting knights who revolve around a track every 15 minutes. (Note: The clock was converted to pendulum-and-anchor escapement in the 17th century, and was installed in London's Science Museum in 1884, where it continues to operate.)

=== Later developments ===
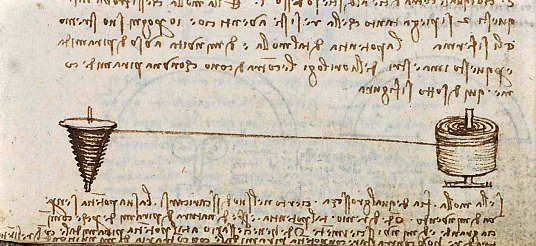
Fusee for clocks drawn by Leonardo da Vinci, from his Treatise of statics and mechanics

The invention of the mainspring in the early 15th century—a device first used in locks and for flintlocks in guns— allowed small clocks to be built for the first time. The need for an escapement mechanism that steadily controlled the release of the stored energy, led to the development of two devices, the stackfreed (which although invented in the 15th century can be documented no earlier than c.1535) and the fusee, which first originated from medieval weapons such as the crossbow. There is a fusee in the earliest surviving spring-driven clock, a chamber clock made for Philip the Good in c. 1430. Leonardo da Vinci, who produced the earliest known drawings of a pendulum in 1493–1494, illustrated a fusee in c. 1500, a quarter of a century after the coiled spring first appeared.

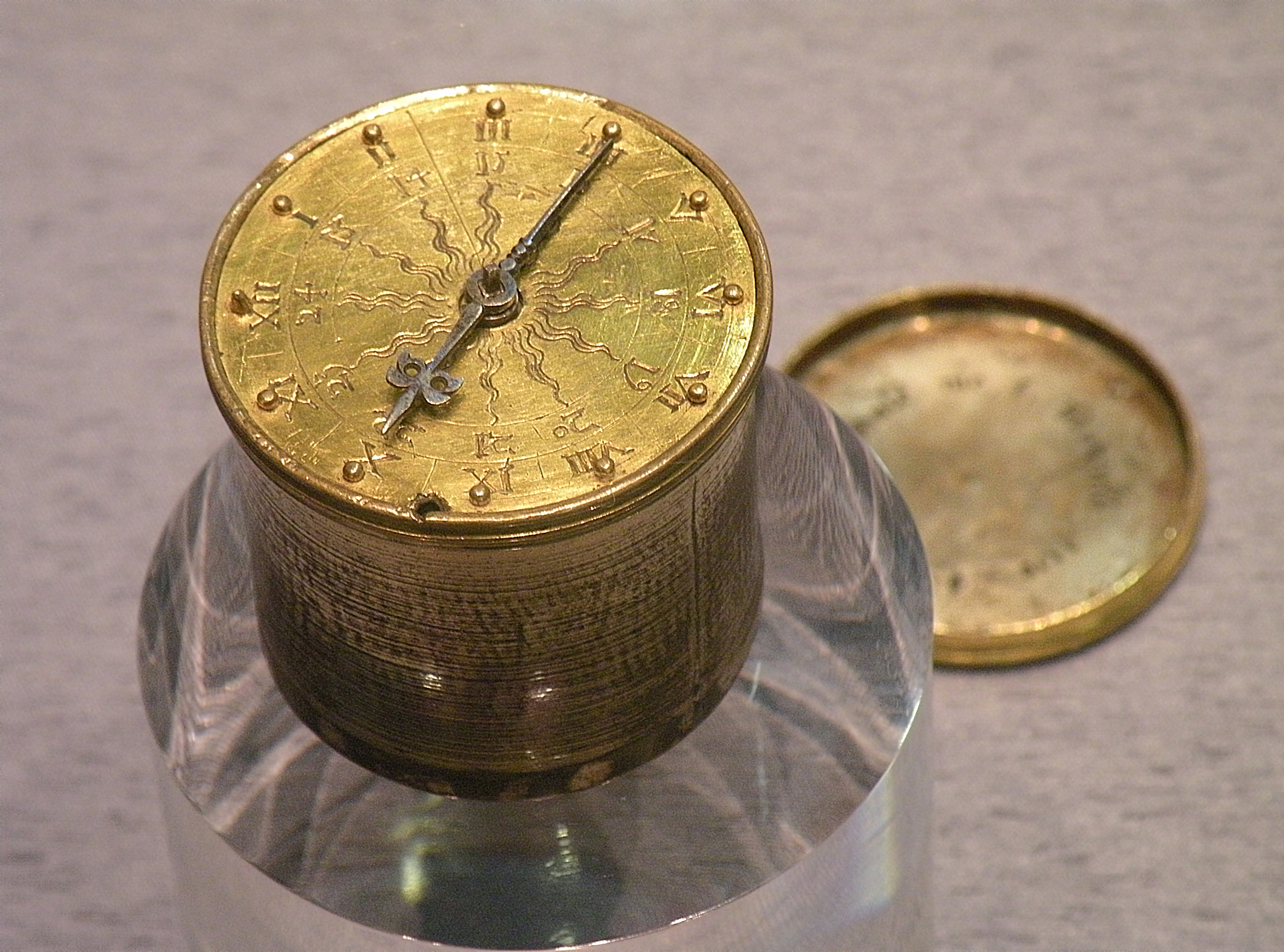
The so-called 'Henlein Watch'

Clock towers in Western Europe in the Middle Ages struck the time. Early clock dials showed hours; a clock with a minutes dial is mentioned in a 1475 manuscript. During the 16th century, timekeepers became more refined and sophisticated, so that by 1577 the Danish astronomer Tycho Brahe was able to obtain the first of four clocks that measured in seconds, and in Nuremberg, the German clockmaker Peter Henlein was paid for making what is thought to have been the earliest example of a watch, made in 1524. By 1500, the use of the foliot in clocks had begun to decline. The oldest surviving spring-driven clock is a device made by Bohemian Jacob Zech in 1525. The first person to suggest travelling with a clock to determine longitude, in 1530, was the Dutch instrument maker Gemma Frisius. The clock would be set to the local time of a starting point whose longitude was known, and the longitude of any other place could be determined by comparing its local time with the clock time.

The Ottoman engineer Taqi ad-Din described a weight-driven clock with a verge-and-foliot escapement, a striking train of gears, an alarm, and a representation of the Moon's phases in his book The Brightest Stars for the Construction of Mechanical Clocks (Al-Kawākib al-durriyya fī wadh' al-bankāmat al-dawriyya), written around 1565. Jesuit missionaries brought the first European clocks to China as gifts.

The Italian polymath Galileo Galilei is thought to have first realized that the pendulum could be used as an accurate timekeeper after watching the motion of suspended lamps at Pisa Cathedral. In 1582, he investigated the regular swing of the pendulum, and discovered that this was only dependent on its length. Galileo never constructed a clock based on his discovery, but prior to his death he dictated instructions for building a pendulum clock to his son, Vincenzo.

== Era of precision timekeeping ==
=== Pendulum clocks ===
The first accurate timekeepers depended on the phenomenon known as harmonic motion, in which the restoring force acting on an object moved away from its equilibrium position—such as a pendulum or an extended spring—acts to return the object to that position, and causes it to oscillate. Harmonic oscillators can be used as accurate timekeepers as the period of oscillation does not depend on the amplitude of the motion—and so it always takes the same time to complete one oscillation. The period of a harmonic oscillator is completely dependent on the physical characteristics of the oscillating system and not the starting conditions or the amplitude.

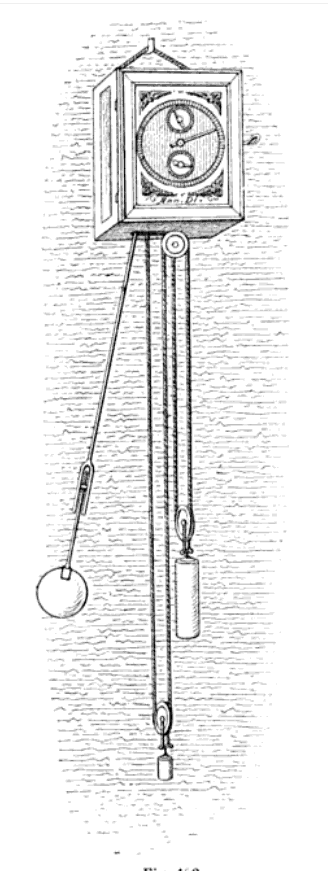
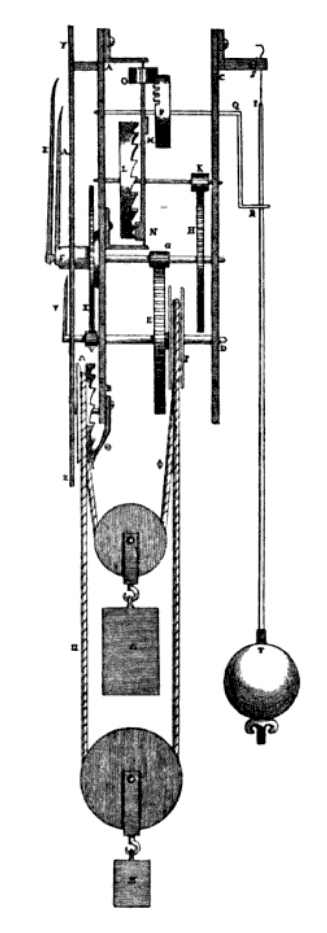
(left and centre) The first pendulum clock, invented by Christiaan Huygens in 1656. His invention increased the accuracy of clocks more than sixty-fold; (right) Netscher's portrait of Huygens (1671).

The period when clocks were controlled by harmonic oscillators was the most productive era in timekeeping. (Note: Harmonically-driven clocks depend on some form of deformation from an equilibrium position; the resulting oscillations have a maximum amplitude when they receive energy at a frequency close to their natural undamped frequency. The main examples of such harmonic oscillators used to keep time are: the electrical resonance circuit; the gravity pendulum; the quartz crystal oscillator and the tuning fork; the balance spring; the torsion spring; and the vertical pendulum.) The first invention of this type was the pendulum clock, which was designed and built by Dutch polymath Christiaan Huygens in 1656. Early versions erred by less than one minute per day, and later ones only by 10 seconds, very accurate for their time. Dials that showed minutes and seconds became common after the increase in accuracy made possible by the pendulum clock. Brahe used clocks with minutes and seconds to observe stellar positions. The pendulum clock outperformed all other kinds of mechanical timekeepers to such an extent that these were usually refitted with a pendulum—a task that could be done without difficulty—so that few verge escapement devices have survived in their original form.

The first pendulum clocks used a verge escapement, which required wide swings of about 100° and so had short, light pendulums. The swing was reduced to around 6° after the invention of the anchor mechanism enabled the use of longer, heavier pendulums with slower beats that had less variation, as they more closely resembled simple harmonic motion, required less power, and caused less friction and wear. The first known anchor escapement clock was built by the English clockmaker William Clement in 1671 for King's College, Cambridge; it is now in the Science Museum, London. The anchor escapement originated with Hooke, although it has been argued that it was invented by Clement, or the English clockmaker Joseph Knibb.

The Jesuits made major contributions to the development of pendulum clocks in the 17th and 18th centuries, having had an "unusually keen appreciation of the importance of precision". In measuring an accurate one-second pendulum, for example, the Italian astronomer Father Giovanni Battista Riccioli persuaded nine fellow Jesuits "to count nearly 87,000 oscillations in a single day". They served a crucial role in spreading and testing the scientific ideas of the period, and collaborated with Huygens and his contemporaries.

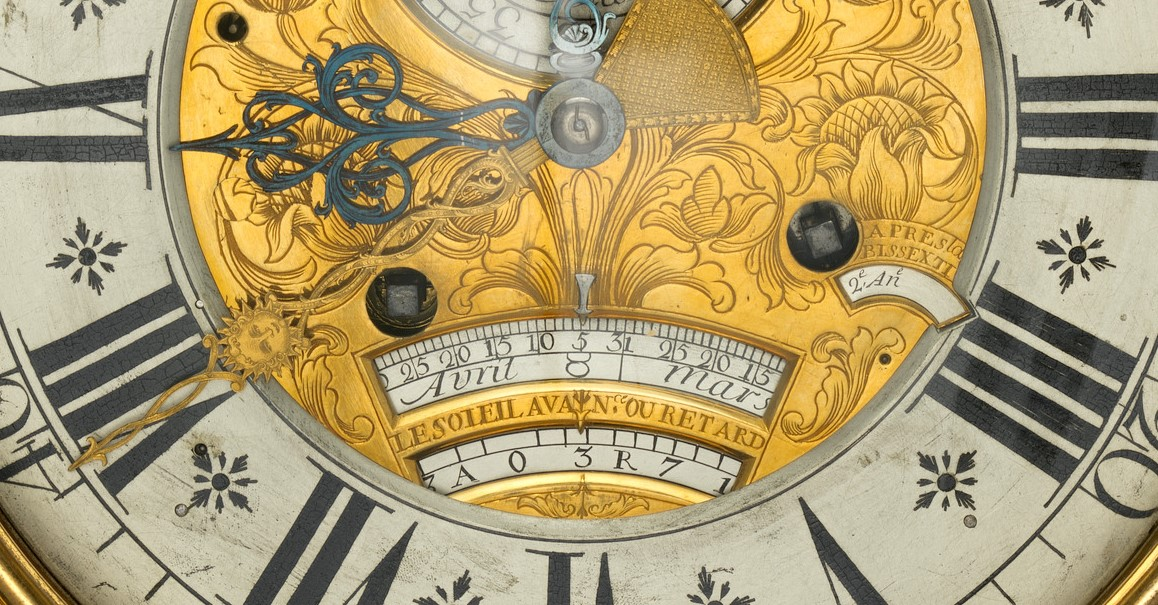
Detail from the face of an equation clock made by Ferdinand Berthoud, c.1752 (Metropolitan Museum of Art, New York)

Huygens first used a clock to calculate the equation of time (the difference between the apparent solar time and the time given by a clock), publishing his results in 1665. The relationship enabled astronomers to use the stars to measure sidereal time, which provided an accurate method for setting clocks. The equation of time was engraved on sundials so that clocks could be set using the Sun. In 1720, Joseph Williamson claimed to have invented a clock that showed solar time, fitted with a cam and differential gearing, so that the clock indicated true solar time.

Other innovations in timekeeping during this period include the invention of the rack and snail striking mechanism for striking clocks by the English mechanician Edward Barlow, the invention by either Barlow or Daniel Quare, a London clock-maker, in 1676 of the repeating clock that chimes the number of hours or minutes, and the deadbeat escapement, invented around 1675 by the astronomer Richard Towneley.

Paris and Blois were the early centres of clockmaking in France, and French clockmakers such as Julien Le Roy, clockmaker of Versailles, were leaders in case design and ornamental clocks. Le Roy belonged to the fifth generation of a family of clockmakers, and was described by his contemporaries as "the most skillful clockmaker in France, possibly in Europe". He invented a special repeating mechanism which improved the precision of clocks and watches, a face that could be opened to view the inside clockwork, and made or supervised over 3,500 watches during his career of almost five decades, which ended with his death in 1759. The competition and scientific rivalry resulting from his discoveries further encouraged researchers to seek new methods of measuring time more accurately.

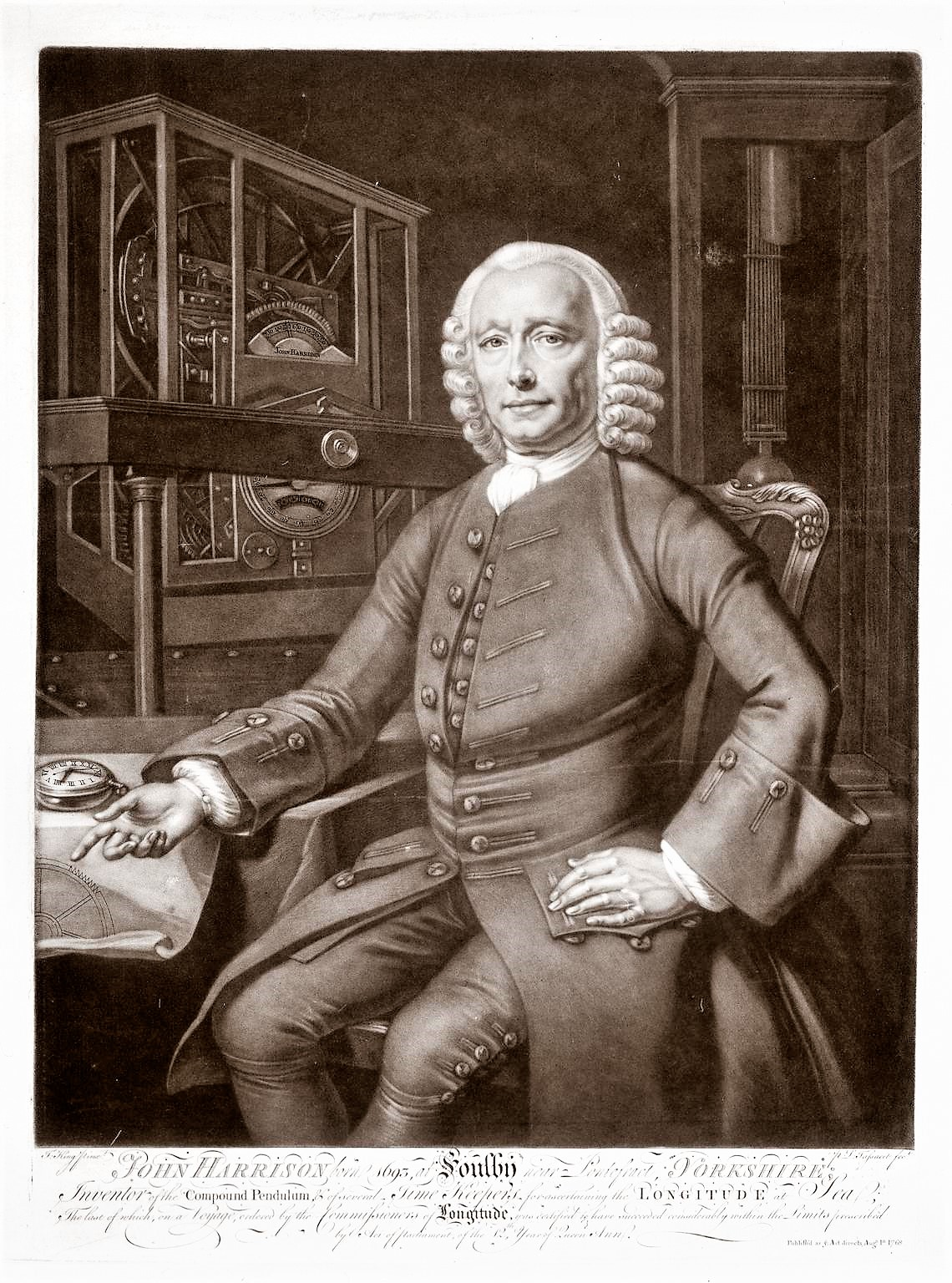
Engraving of John Harrison, with his gridiron pendulum shown in the background (1768). Science Museum, London

Any inherent errors in early pendulum clocks were smaller than other errors caused by factors such as temperature variation. In 1729 the Yorkshire carpenter and self-taught clockmaker John Harrison invented the gridiron pendulum, which used at least three metals of different lengths and expansion properties, connected so as to maintain the overall length of the pendulum when it is heated or cooled by its surroundings. In 1721 the clockmaker George Graham had compensated for temperature variation in an iron pendulum by using a bob made from a glass jar of mercury—a liquid metal at room temperature that expands faster than glass. More accurate versions of this innovation contained the mercury in thinner iron jars to make them more responsive. This type of temperature compensating pendulum was improved still further when the mercury was contained within the rod itself, which allowed the two metals to be thermally coupled more tightly. In 1895, the invention of invar, an alloy made from iron and nickel that expands very little, largely eliminated the need for earlier inventions designed to compensate for the variation in temperature.

Between 1794 and 1795, in the aftermath of the French Revolution, the French government mandated the use of decimal time, with a day divided into 10 hours of 100 minutes each. A clock in the Palais des Tuileries kept decimal time as late as 1801.

=== Marine chronometer ===
After the Scilly naval disaster of 1707, in which four ships were wrecked as a result of navigational mistakes, the British government offered a prize of £20,000, equivalent to millions of pounds today, for anyone who could determine the longitude to within 50 kilometres (31 mi) at a latitude just north of the equator. The position of a ship at sea could be determined to within 100 kilometres (62 mi) if a navigator could refer to a clock that lost or gained less than about six seconds per day. Proposals were examined by a newly created Board of Longitude. Among the many people who attempted to claim the prize was the Yorkshire clockmaker Jeremy Thacker, who first used the term chronometer in a pamphlet published in 1714. Huygens built the first sea clock, designed to remain horizontal aboard a moving ship, but that stopped working if the ship moved suddenly.

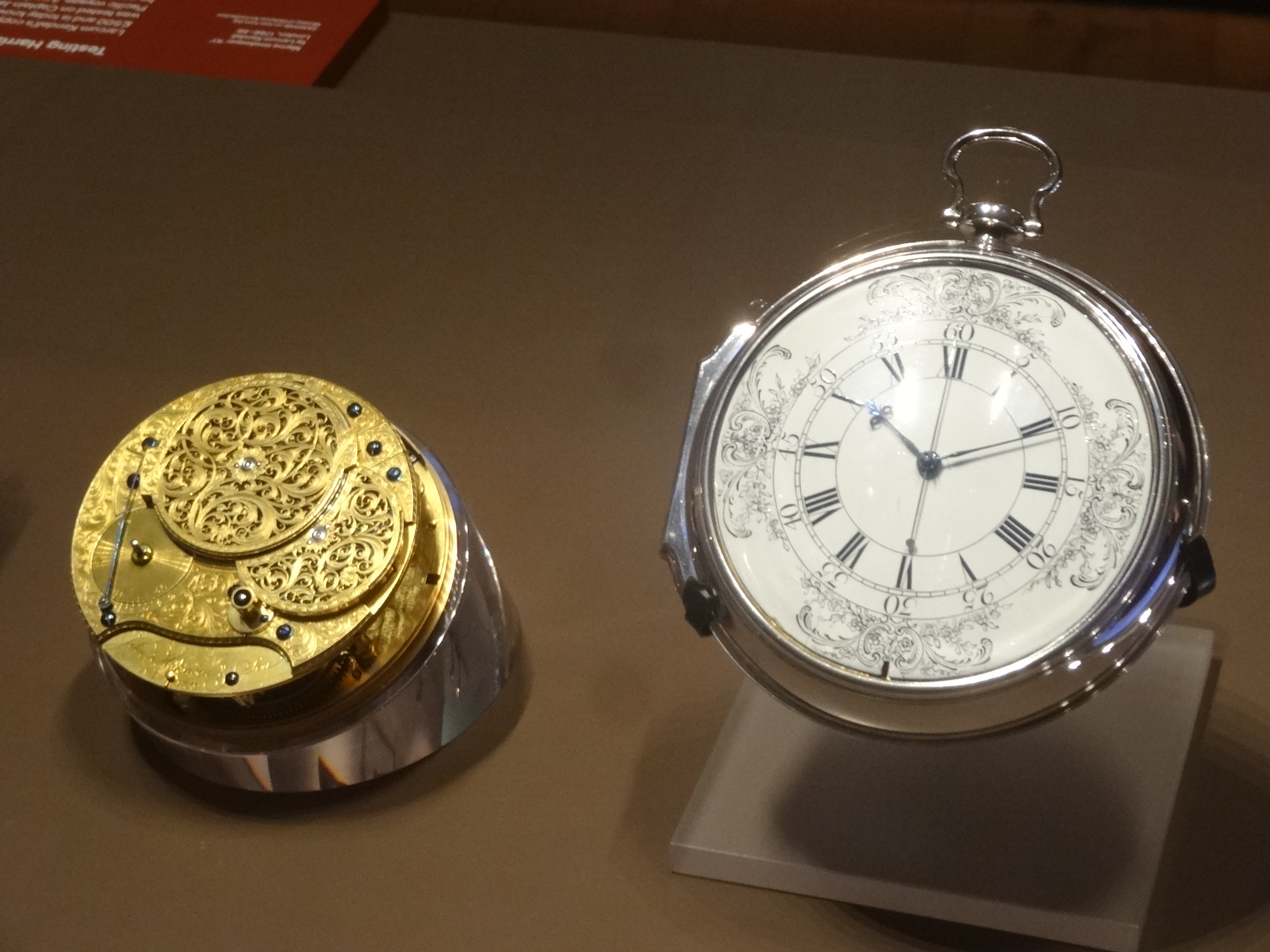
Harrison's H4 chronometer, disassembled

In 1715, at the age of 22, John Harrison had used his carpentry skills to construct a wooden eight-day clock. His clocks had innovations that included the use of wooden parts to remove the need for additional lubrication (and cleaning), rollers to reduce friction, a new kind of escapement, and the use of two different metals to reduce the problem of expansion caused by temperature variation. He travelled to London to seek assistance from the Board of Longitude in making a sea clock. He was sent to visit Graham, who assisted Harrison by arranging to finance his work to build a clock. After 30 years, his device, now named "H1" was built and in 1736 it was tested at sea. Harrison then went on to design and make two other sea clocks, "H2" (completed in around 1739) and "H3", both of which were ready by 1755.

Harrison made two watches, "H4" and "H5". Eric Bruton, in his book The History of Clocks and Watches, has described H4 as "probably the most remarkable timekeeper ever made". After the completion of its sea trials during the winter of 1761–1762 it was found that it was three times more accurate than was needed for Harrison to be awarded the Longitude prize.

=== Electric clocks ===
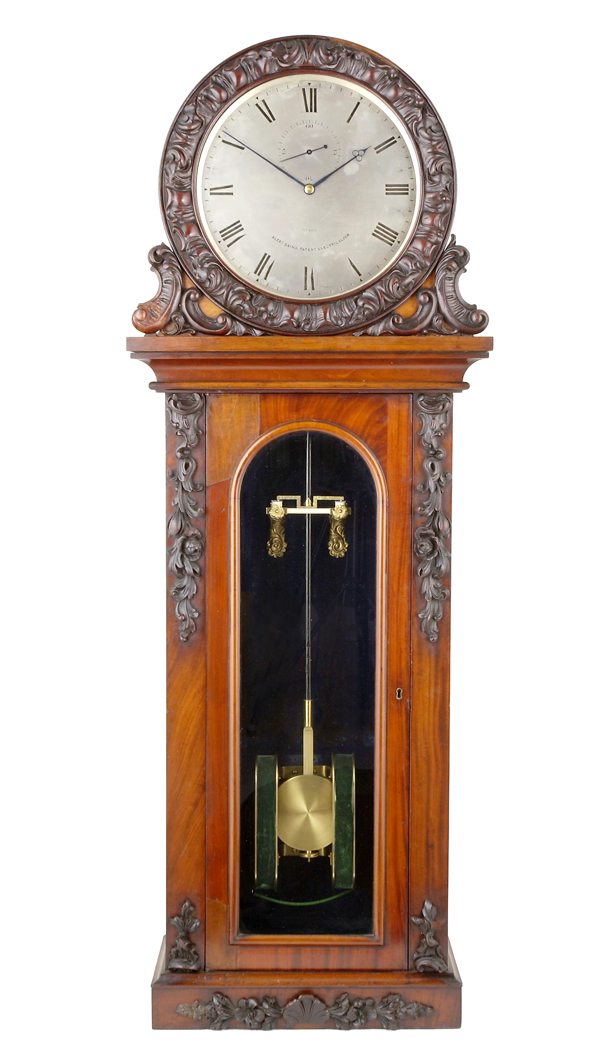
One of Alexander Bain's early electromagnetic clocks, from the 1840s

In 1815, the prolific English inventor Francis Ronalds produced the forerunner of the electric clock, the electrostatic clock. It was powered with dry piles, a high voltage battery with extremely long life but the disadvantage of its electrical properties varying according to the air temperature and humidity. He experimented with ways of regulating the electricity and his improved devices proved to be more reliable.

In 1840 the Scottish clock and instrument maker Alexander Bain first used electricity to sustain the motion of a pendulum clock, and so can be credited with the invention of the electric clock. On January 11, 1841, Bain and the chronometer maker John Barwise took out a patent describing a clock with an electromagnetic pendulum. The English scientist Charles Wheatstone, whom Bain met in London to discuss his ideas for an electric clock, produced his own version of the clock in November 1840, but Bain won a legal battle to establish himself as the inventor.

In 1857, the French physicist Jules Lissajous showed how an electric current can be used to vibrate a tuning fork indefinitely, and was probably the first to use the invention as a method for accurately measuring frequency. The piezoelectric properties of crystalline quartz were discovered by the French physicist brothers Jacques and Pierre Curie in 1880.

The most accurate pendulum clocks were controlled electrically. The Shortt–Synchronome clock, an electrically-driven pendulum clock designed in 1921, was the first clock to be a more accurate timekeeper than the Earth itself.

A succession of innovations and discoveries led to the invention of the modern quartz timer. The vacuum tube oscillator was invented in 1912. An electrical oscillator was first used to sustain the motion of a tuning fork by the British physicist William Eccles in 1919; his achievement removed much of the damping associated with mechanical devices and maximised the stability of the vibration's frequency. The first quartz crystal oscillator was built by the American engineer Walter G. Cady in 1921, and in October 1927 the first quartz clock was described by Joseph Horton and Warren Marrison at Bell Telephone Laboratories. (Note: Quartz resonators can vibrate with very a small amplitude that can be precisely controlled, properties that allow them to have a remarkable degree of frequency stability.) The following decades saw the development of quartz clocks as precision time measurement devices in laboratory settings—the bulky and delicate counting electronics, built with vacuum tubes, limited their practical use elsewhere. In 1932, a quartz clock able to measure small weekly variations in the rotation rate of the Earth was developed. Their inherent physical and chemical stability and accuracy has resulted in the subsequent proliferation, and since the 1940s they have formed the basis for precision measurements of time and frequency worldwide.

== Development of the watch ==
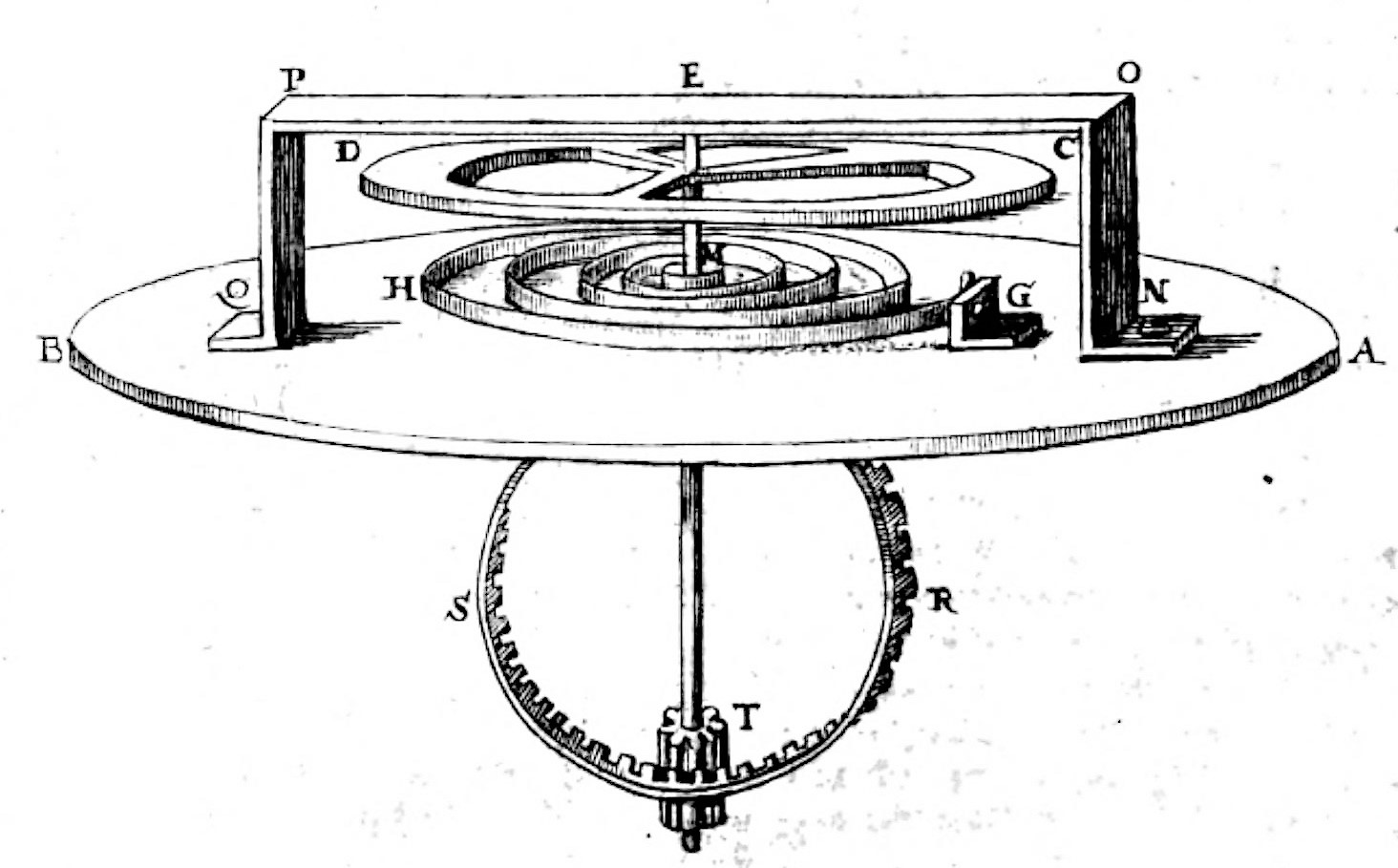
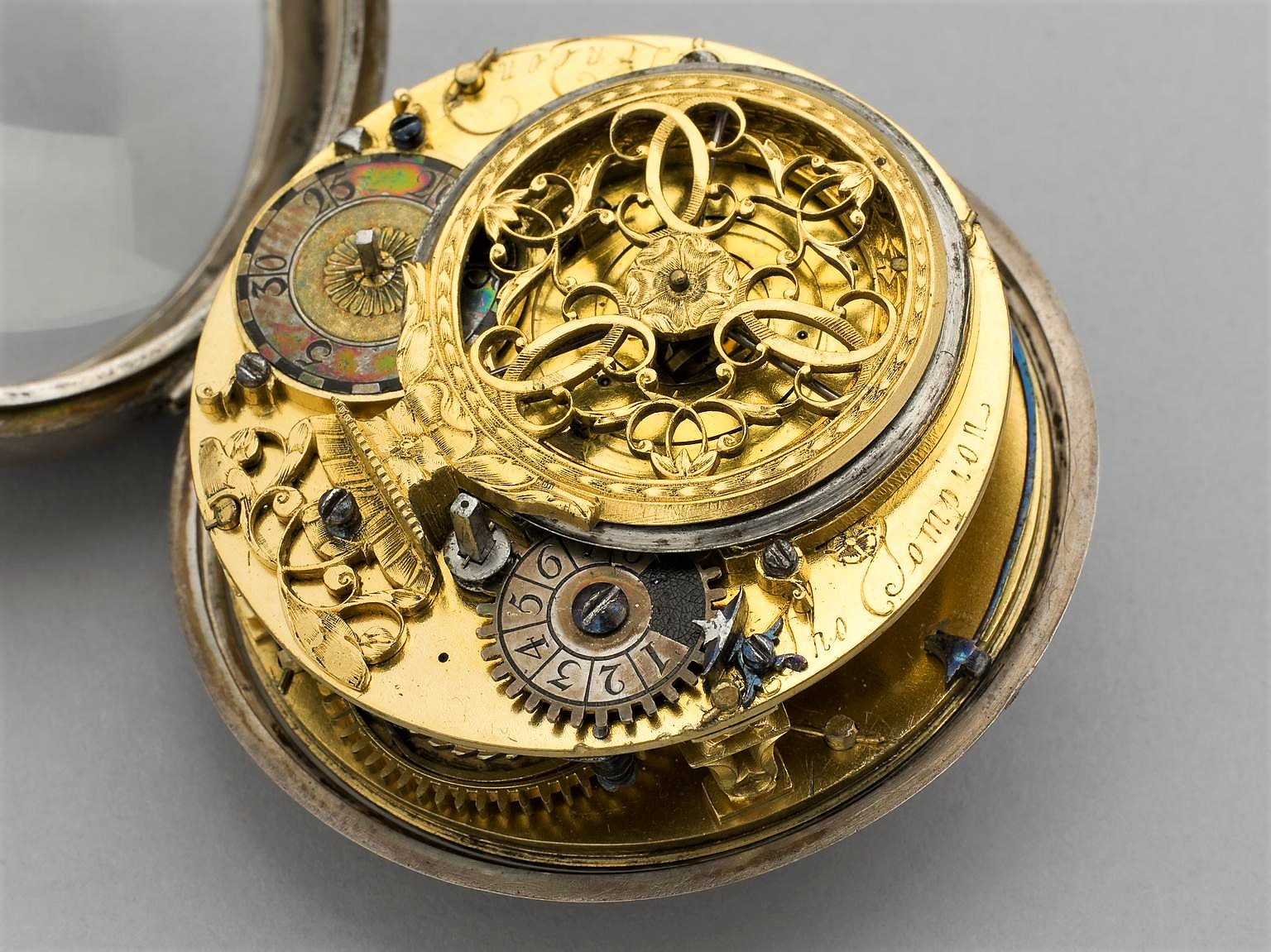
(Above) An illustration of a Huygens balance spring attached to a balance wheel; (below) an early balance spring watch by Thomas Tompion

The first wristwatches were made in the 16th century. Elizabeth I of England had made an inventory in 1572 of the watches she acquired, all of which were considered to be part of her jewellery collection. The first pocketwatches were inaccurate, as their size precluded them from having sufficiently well-made moving parts. Unornamented watches began to appear in c. 1625.

Dials that showed minutes and seconds became common after the increase in accuracy made possible by the balance spring (or hairspring). Invented separately in 1675 by Huygens and Hooke, it enabled the oscillations of the balance wheel to have a fixed frequency. The invention resulted in a great advance in the accuracy of the mechanical watch, from around half an hour to within a few minutes per day. Some dispute remains as to whether the balance spring was first invented by Huygens or by Hooke; both scientists claimed to have come up with the idea of the balance spring first. Huygens' design for the balance spring is the type used in virtually all watches up to the present day.

Thomas Tompion was one of the first clockmakers to recognise the potential of the balance spring and use it successfully in his pocket watches; the improved accuracy enabled watches to perform as well as they are generally used today, as a second hand to be added to the face, a development that occurred during the 1690s. The concentric minute hand was an earlier invention, but a mechanism was devised by Quare that enabled the hands to be actuated together. Nicolas Fatio de Duillier, a Swiss natural philosopher, is credited with the design of the first jewel bearings in watches in 1704.

Other notable 18th-century English horologists include John Arnold and Thomas Earnshaw, who devoted their careers to constructing high-quality chronometers and so-called 'deck watches', smaller versions of the chronometer that could be kept in a pocket.

=== Military use of the watch ===
Watches were worn during the Franco-Prussian War (1870–1871), and by the time of the Boer War (1899–1902), watches had been recognised as a valuable tool. Early models were essentially standard pocket watches fitted to a leather strap, but, by the early 20th century, manufacturers began producing purpose-built wristwatches. In 1904, Alberto Santos-Dumont, an early aviator, asked his friend the French watchmaker Louis Cartier to design a watch that could be useful during his flights.

During World War I, wristwatches were used by artillery officers. The so-called trench watch, or 'wristlets' were practical, as they freed up one hand that would normally be used to operate a pocket watch, and became standard equipment. The demands of trench warfare meant that soldiers needed to protect the glass of their watches, and a guard in the form of a hinged cage was sometimes used. The guard was designed to allow the numerals to be read easily, but it obscured the hands—a problem that was solved after the introduction of shatter-resistant Plexiglass in the 1930s. Prior to the advent of its military use, the wristwatch was typically only worn by women, but during World War I they became symbols of masculinity and bravado.

=== Modern watches ===
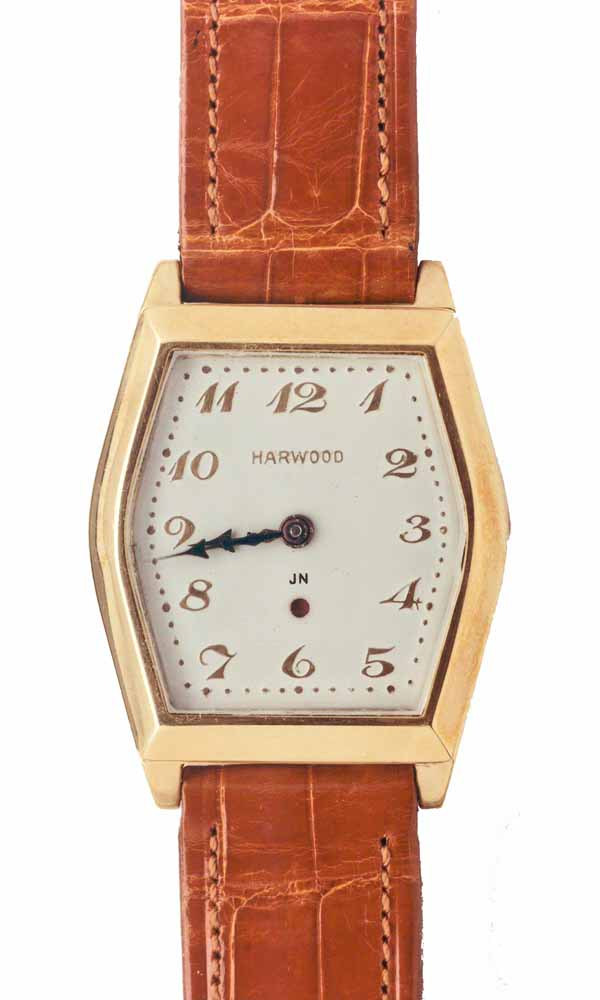
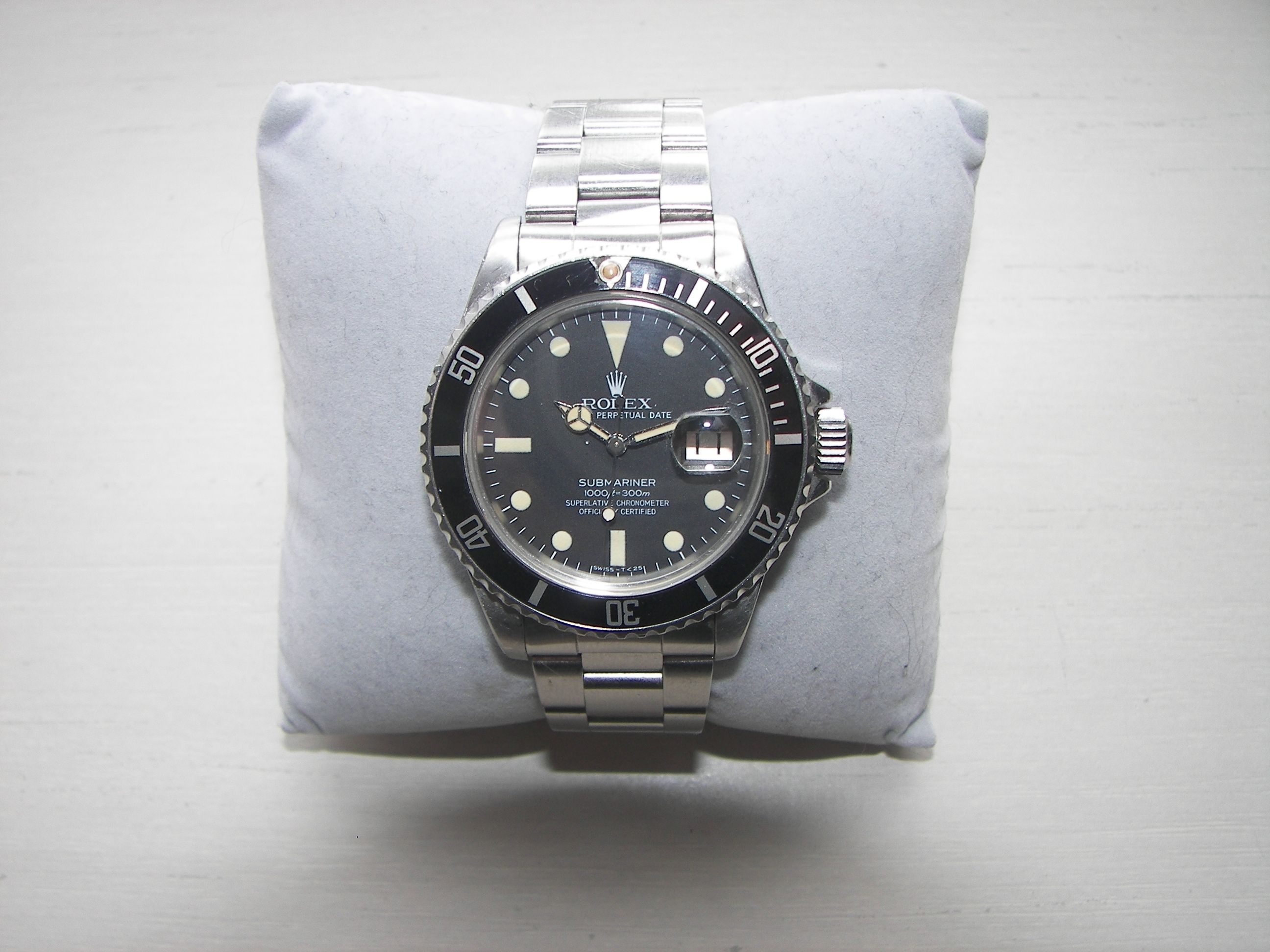
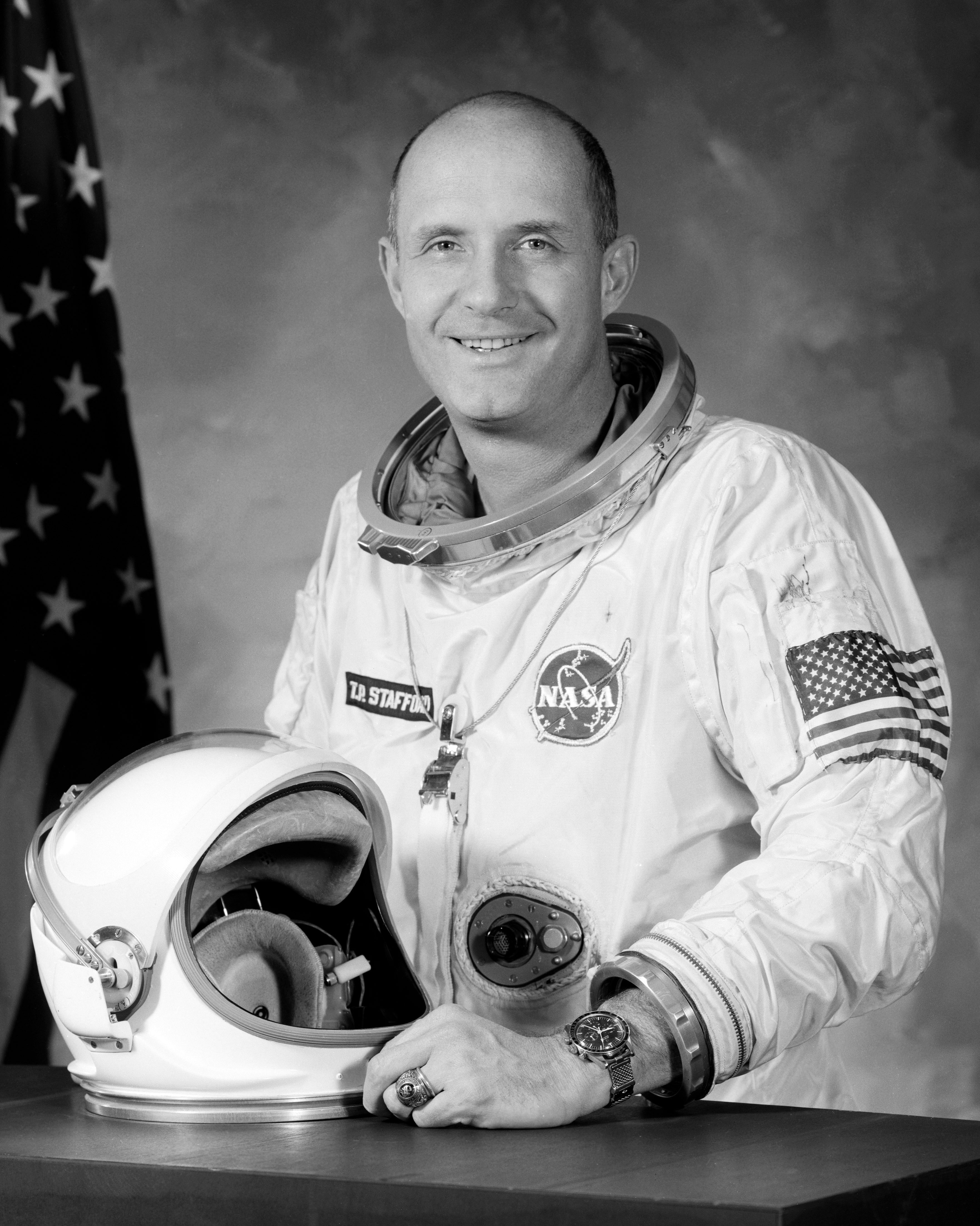
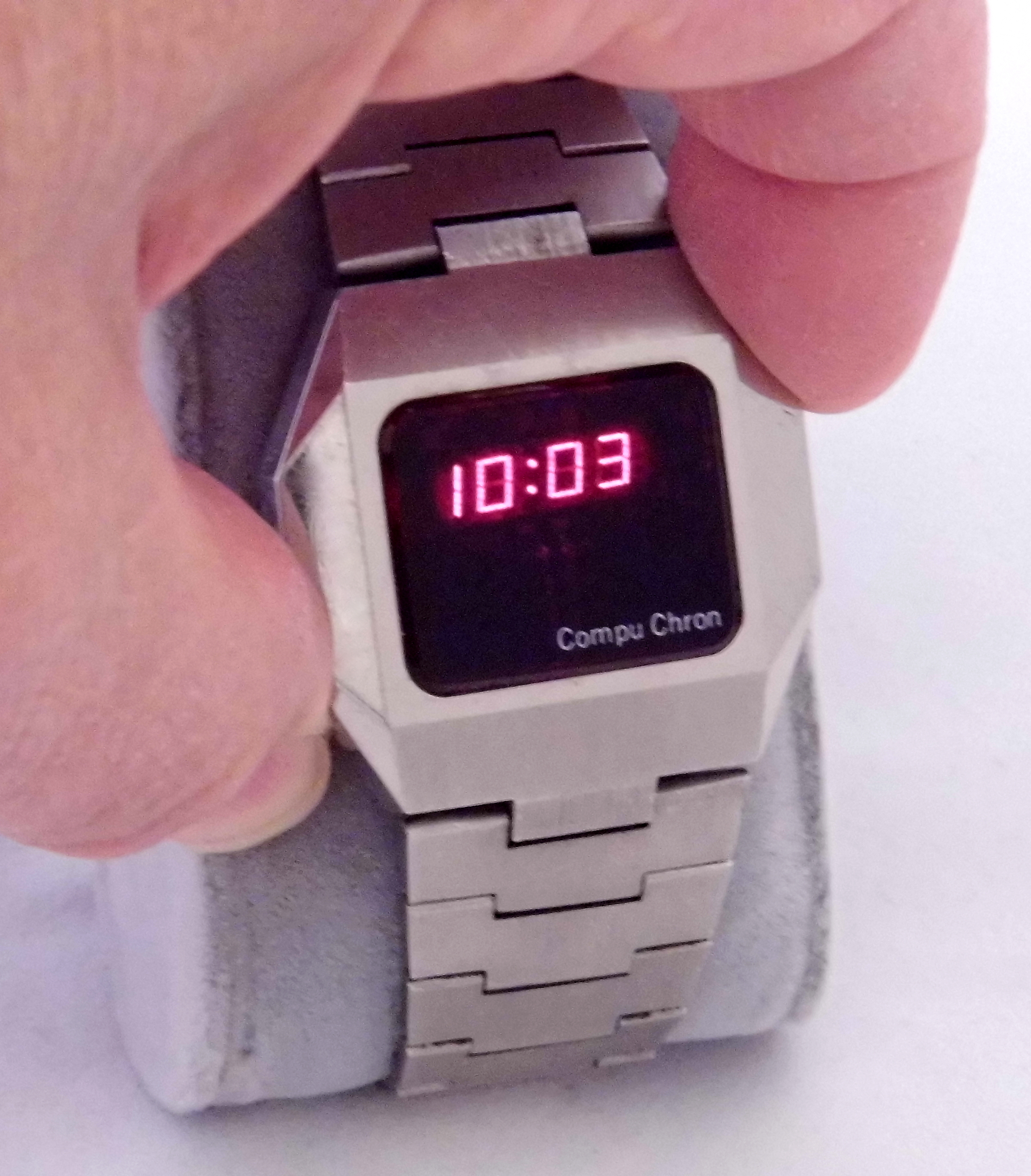
Modern wristwatches: a Harwood automatic watch (1920s); a Rolex Submariner watch (1950s); astronaut Thomas P. Stafford in 1966, wearing a Speedmaster; a digital quartz wristwatch (c. 1970s).

Fob watches were starting to be replaced at the turn of the 20th century. The Swiss, who were neutral throughout World War I, produced wristwatches for both sides of the conflict. The introduction of the tank influenced the design of the Cartier Tank watch, and the design of watches during the 1920s was influenced by the Art Deco style. The automatic watch, first introduced with limited success in the 18th century, was reintroduced in the 1920s by the English watchmaker John Harwood. After he went bankrupt in 1929, restrictions on automatic watches were lifted and companies such as Rolex were able to produce them. In 1930, Tissot produced the first ever non-magnetic wristwatch.

The first battery-driven watches were developed in the 1950s. High quality watches were produced by firms such as Patek Philippe, an example being a Patek Philippe ref. 1518, introduced in 1941, possibly the most complicated wristwatch ever made in stainless steel, which fetched a world record price in 2016 when it was sold at auction for $11,136,642.

The manual winding Speedmaster Professional or "Moonwatch" was worn during the first United States spacewalk as part of NASA's Gemini 4 mission and was the first watch worn by an astronaut walking on the Moon during the Apollo 11 mission. In 1969, Seiko produced the world's first quartz wristwatch, the Astron.

During the 1970s, the introduction of digital watches made using transistors and plastic parts enabled companies to reduce their work force. By the 1970s, many of those firms that maintained more complicated metalworking techniques had gone bankrupt.

Smartwatches, essentially wearable computers in the form of watches, were introduced to the market in the early 21st century.

== Atomic clocks ==
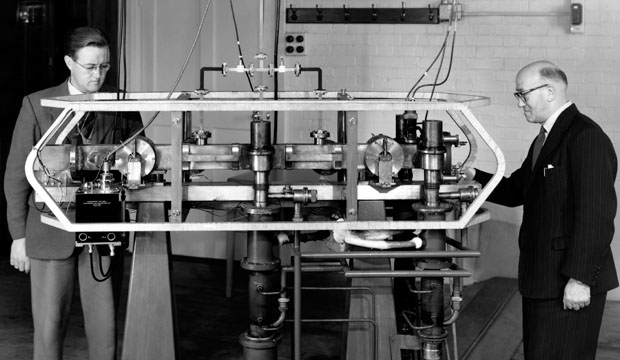
Louis Essen (right) and Jack Parry standing next to the world's first caesium-133 atomic clock at the National Physical Laboratory in London

Atomic clocks are the most accurate timekeeping devices in practical use today. Accurate to within a few seconds over many thousands of years, they are used to calibrate other clocks and timekeeping instruments. The U.S. National Bureau of Standards (NBS, now National Institute of Standards and Technology (NIST)) changed the way it based the time standard of the United States from quartz to atomic clocks in the 1960s.

The idea of using atomic transitions to measure time was first suggested by the British scientist Lord Kelvin in 1879, although it was only in the 1930s with the development of magnetic resonance that there was a practical method for measuring time in this way. A prototype ammonia maser device was built in 1948 at NIST. Although less accurate than existing quartz clocks, it served to prove the concept of an atomic clock.

The first accurate atomic clock, a caesium standard based on a certain transition of the caesium-133 atom, was built by the English physicist Louis Essen in 1955 at the National Physical Laboratory in London. It was calibrated by the use of the astronomical time scale ephemeris time (ET).

In 1967 the International System of Units (SI) standardized its unit of time, the second, on the properties of caesium. The SI defined the second as 9,192,631,770 cycles of the radiation which corresponds to the transition between two electron spin energy levels of the ground state of the ^{133}Cs atom. The caesium atomic clock maintained by NIST is accurate to 30 billionths of a second per year. Atomic clocks have employed other elements, such as hydrogen and rubidium vapor, offering greater stability (in the case of hydrogen clocks) and smaller size, lower power consumption, and thus lower cost (in the case of rubidium clocks). Recent advances in clock technology have largely been based on trapped ion platforms, with the record for the lowest systematic uncertainty being traded between aluminum ion clocks and strontium optical lattice clocks. Next-generation clocks will likely be based on nuclear transitions in the ^{229m}Th nucleus, as nuclei are shielded from external effects by the accompanying electron cloud, and the transition frequency is much higher than optical and ion clocks, allowing for much lower systematic uncertainty in the clock frequency.

== See also ==
- Clockmaker – Artisan who makes and repairs clocks
- Clock synchronization – Coordination of independent clocks
- Coordinated Universal Time – Primary time standard globally used to regulate clocks and time (UTC)
- Dimensional metrology – Specialization
- Forensic metrology – Science of measurement applied to forensics
- History of timekeeping devices in Egypt
- Quantum metrology – Application of quantum entanglement to high-precision measurement
- Quartz crisis – 1970s–80s watchmaking industry upheaval
- Seconds pendulum – Pendulum whose period is precisely two seconds
- Smart Metrology – Approach to industrial metrology
- Time metrology – Application of metrology for timekeeping
- Time standard – Specification for measuring time
- Timekeeping on the Moon#History
- Timeline of time measurement inventions
- Watchmaker – Artisan who makes and repairs watches
