= History of timekeeping devices in Egypt =

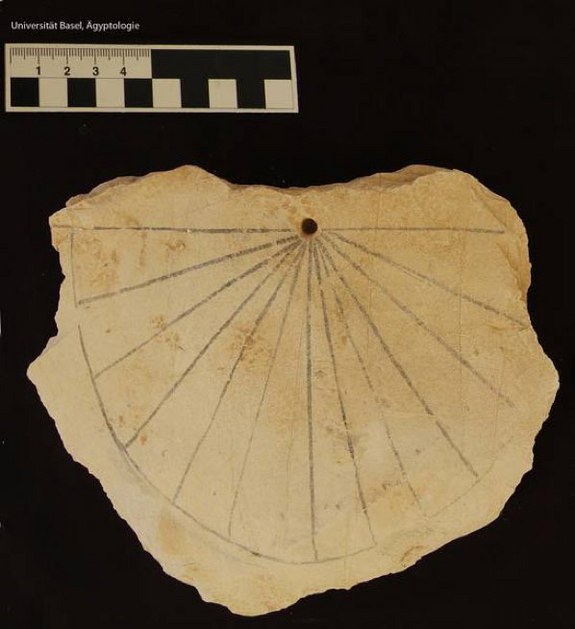
Ancient Egyptian sundial (c. 1500 BC), from the Valley of the Kings, used for measuring work hour. Daytime divided into 12 parts.

The ancient Egyptians were one of the first cultures to widely divide days into generally agreed-upon equal parts, using early timekeeping devices such as sundials, shadow clocks, and merkhets (plumb-lines used by early astronomers). The clock was split into daytime and nighttime, and then into smaller hours.

== Sundials and shadow clocks ==
Despite Herodotus's attribution of the invention of the sundial to the Babylonians in 430 BCE, the earliest known sundials were simple gnomons of Egyptian origin invented around 3500 BCE. More complex devices were developed over time, the earliest surviving one is a limestone sundial that dates back to 1500 BCE, discovered in the Valley of the Kings in 2013. It was found in a housing area of construction workers and its division of daytime into 12 parts was possibly used to measure work hours.

Shadow clocks were modified sundials that allowed for greater precision in determining the time of day, and were first used around 1500 BCE. Their major innovation was a modified, more precise gnomon that allowed for the division of night time into 50 parts, with an additional two "twilight hours" in the morning and evening. The shadow clock gnomon was made up of a long stem divided into six parts, as well as an elevated crossbar that cast a shadow over the marks. This early clock was positioned eastward in the morning, while at noon it was rotated to face west to measure shadows cast by the setting sun. The concept of measured shadows were adapted into larger, more public designs in the form of obelisks. Markers around the obelisk would indicate units of time, including morning and afternoon as well as the summer and winter solstices for ceremonial purposes.

== Merkhets ==
Using plumb-lines called merkhets, the Egyptians could calculate time at night, provided the stars were visible. Used since at least 600 BCE, two of these instruments were aligned with Polaris, the North pole star, creating a north–south meridian. By observing certain stars as they crossed the line created with the merkhets, they could accurately gauge time.

== See also ==
- History of timekeeping devices
