= Merkhet =

Timekeeping instrument in ancient Egypt

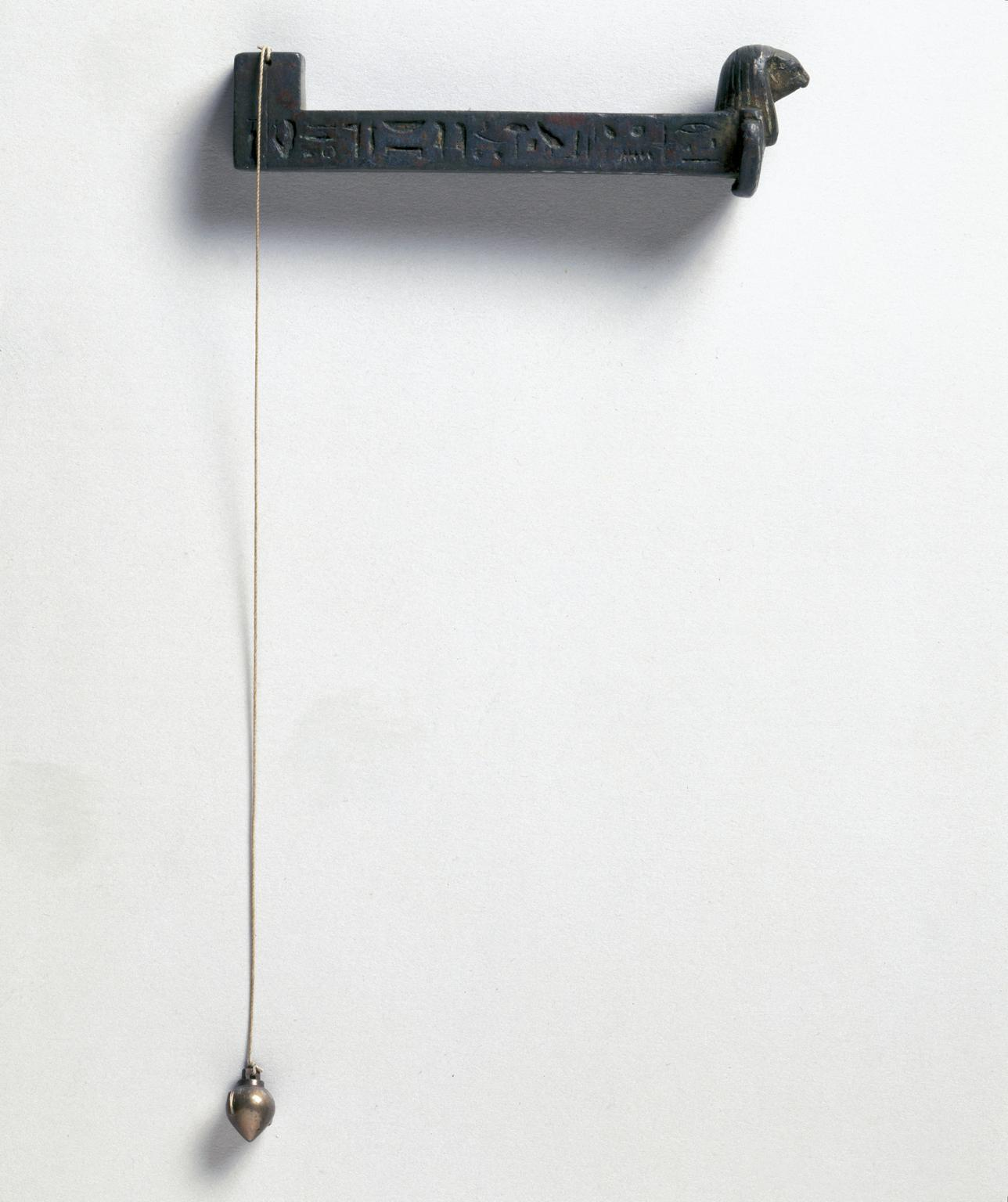
A merkhet (Science Museum, London)

The merkhet or merjet (Ancient Egyptian: mrḫt, 'instrument of knowing') was an ancient surveying and timekeeping instrument. It involved the use of a bar with a plumb line, attached to a wooden handle. It was used to track the alignment of certain stars called decans or "baktiu" in the Ancient Egyptian. When visible, the stars could be used to measure the time at night. There were 10 stars for the 10 hours of the night; the day had a total of 24 hours including 12 hours for the day, 1 hour for sunset, and 1 hour for sunrise. Merkhets were used to replace sundials, which were useless during the dark.

== Design ==
The meridian line

The exact design of the merkhet consists of a horizontal bar, usually carved from wood or bone, with a plumb line hanging from a transverse hole at one raised end of the bar, attached to a controlling wooden handle. As deduced by texts and engravings on the inner walls of the temples of Dendera and Edfu, the merkhet was typically used in conjunction with a corresponding sighting tool, which the Egyptians called a bay, itself made from a specially cut palm-rib with a sliced "V" shape at one end. The two together could also be used, as appropriate, to determine North.

The meridian line was crucial to the Egyptians when they observed the movement of celestial bodies across the night sky. As the earth rotates, all the visible objects in the sky all cross this line. The Egyptians determined time by observing the transits of particular stars as they crossed the meridian and came into alignment with two merkhets, one of which was aligned with Polaris (and so indicated north). The names of the celestial bodies used to determine time in this way are not known.

== Surviving examples ==
A few merkhets have been preserved, including one in the Science Museum in London. This particular exhibit dates to 600 BC, and, according to a related inscription, belonged to the son of a priest who hailed from a temple dedicated to the Egyptian god Horus, located close to Edfu in Upper Egypt.

== See also ==
- History of timekeeping devices
- History of timekeeping devices in Egypt
