= Incense clock =

Chinese timekeeping device

Chinese name
- Simplified Chinese: 香钟
- Traditional Chinese: 香鐘
Transcriptions
Standard Mandarin
- Hanyu Pinyin: Xiāngzhōng
- Wade–Giles: Hsiang-chung
Yue: Cantonese
- Jyutping: Hoeng^{1}zung^{1}

Korean name
- Hangul: 향종
- Hanja: 香鐘
Transcriptions
- Revised Romanization: Hyangjong
- McCune–Reischauer: Hyangjong

Japanese name
- Kanji: 香鐘
- Hiragana: かしょう
Transcriptions
- Romanization: Kashō

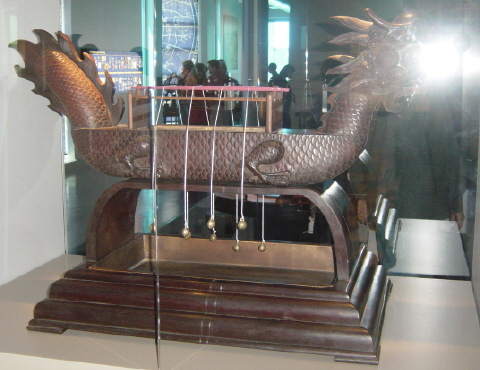
A replica of an ancient Chinese stick incense clock

The incense clock (simplified Chinese: 香钟; traditional Chinese: 香鐘; pinyin: xiāngzhōng; Wade–Giles: hsiang-chung; lit. 'fragrance clock') is a timekeeping device that originated from China during the Song dynasty (960–1279) and spread to neighboring East Asian countries such as Japan and Korea. The clocks' bodies are effectively specialized censers that hold incense sticks or powdered incense that have been manufactured and calibrated to a known rate of combustion, used to measure minutes, hours, or days. The clock may also contain bells and gongs which act as strikers. Although the water clock and astronomical clock were known in China (example: Su Song), incense clocks were commonly used at homes and temples in dynastic times.

== History ==
In addition to water, mechanical, and candle clocks, incense clocks were used in Asia and were fashioned in several different forms. Incense clocks were first used in China around the 6th century; spread to Japan, as one survives in the Shōsōin. Early incense clocks found in China between the 6th and 8th centuries CE seem to have Devanāgarī carvings on them rather than Chinese seal characters. American historian Edward Schafer speculates that the incense clocks were derived from India, transmitted to China. However, no incense clock has been found in India. Historian Silvio Bedini asserts that the carvings were based on from seals mentioned in Tantric Buddhist scriptures, after those scriptures from India were translated into Chinese, but the time-telling function of the seal was designed and incorporated by the Chinese.

== Types ==
Several types of incense clock have been found, the most common forms include the incense stick and incense seal.

=== Stick incense clocks ===
An incense stick clock uses incense sticks that have been calibrated to known burning rates. Most of these clocks were elaborate, sometimes having threads with weights attached at even intervals. The weights would drop onto a platter or gong below, signifying that a set amount of time had elapsed. Some incense clocks were held in elegant trays; open-bottomed trays were also used, to allow the weights to be used together with the decorative tray. Sticks of incense with different scents were also used, so that the hours were marked by a change in fragrance. The incense sticks could be straight or spiraled; the spiraled ones were longer, and were therefore intended for long periods of use, and often hung from the roofs of homes and temples. In fact one of the side jobs of the time keeper in ancient Chinese cities was to mark calibrated incense with individual lines, to denote length of a burn for sale to the public. This was done to supplement the individual's often meager incomes.

In Chinese medicine doctors would make multiple partial breaks on an incense stick as instructions to the patient such that the patient would take a dose of medication every time the incense has burned to one of these breaks. In Japan, a geisha was paid for the number of senko-dokei (incense clocks) that had been consumed while she was present, a practice which continued until 1924.

=== Powdered incense clocks ===
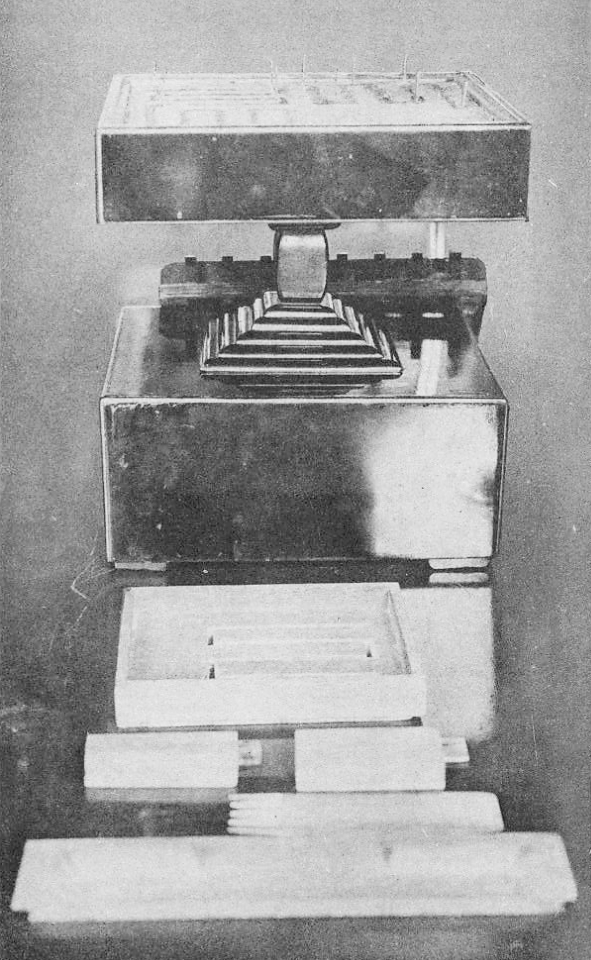
Incense clock in Japan, the Edo period

Incense seal clocks are essentially specialized censers, that work through burning lines of powdered incense seals (香印 xiāng yìn in Chinese; 香時計 ko-dokei in Japanese). They were used for similar occasions and events as the stick incense clock. While religious purposes were of primary importance, these clocks were also popular at social gatherings, and were used by Chinese scholars and intellectuals. The seal was a wooden or stone disk with one or more grooves etched in it into which incense was placed.

These clocks were common in China, but were produced in fewer numbers in Japan. To signal the passage of a set amount of time, small pieces of fragrant woods, resins, or differently scented incense could be placed on the incense powder trails. Different powdered incense clocks used different formulations of incense, depending on how the clock was laid out. The length of the trail of incense, directly related to the size of the seal, was the primary factor in determining how long the clock would last; all burned for long periods of time, ranging between 12 hours and a month.

While early incense seals were made of wood or stone, the Chinese gradually introduced disks made of metal, most likely beginning during the Song dynasty. They were often made of paktong in the form of multileveled small boxes with patterned perforated tops. Gold and silver powder incense clocks are considered quite rare. This allowed craftsmen to more easily create both large and small seals, as well as design and decorate them more aesthetically. Another advantage was the ability to vary the paths of the grooves, to allow for the changing length of the days in the year. As smaller seals became more readily available, the clocks grew in popularity among the Chinese, and were often given as gifts. Incense seal clocks are often sought by modern-day clock collectors; however, few remain that have not already been purchased or been placed on display at museums or temples. Although they are no longer used formally for time keeping, such incense clocks are still used by scholars and monks in the East for evoking moods and for aesthetics.

Using incense seal clocks requires a period of preparation. A fine layer of damp white wood ash is first laid down in a small container, flattened, and lightly compacted. Seals that were in the form of patterned metal stencils were simply laid down on the ash while the incense powder was poured over it. After a light compaction of the incense powder by a tamper, lifting up the metal seal forms a long trail of incense powder that has been masked onto the ash. Other seals have a protruded pattern that creates a negative indentation in the wood ash. The incense powder is carefully spooned into the indentation in the ash and then recompacted again with the seal.

== See also ==
- Incense in China
- History of timekeeping devices
