= Timeline of time measurement inventions =

This timeline of time measurement inventions is a chronological list of particularly important or significant technological inventions relating to timekeeping devices and their inventors, where known.

Note: Dates for inventions are often controversial. Sometimes inventions are invented by several inventors around the same time, or may be invented in an impractical form many years before another inventor improves the invention into a more practical form. Where there is ambiguity, the date of the first known working version of the invention is used here.

== Classical antiquity ==
- c. 3500 BC - Egyptian obelisks are among the earliest shadow clocks.
- c. 1500 BC - The oldest of all known sundials, dating back to the 19th Dynasty.
- c. 500 BC - A shadow clock is developed similar in shape to a bent T-square.
- 3rd century BC - Berossos invents the hemispherical sundial.
- 270 BCE - Ctesibius builds a water clock.

== Medieval era ==
- 11th century - Sets of hourglasses were maintained by ship's pages to mark the progress of a ship during its voyage
- 11th century - Large town clocks were used in Europe to display local time, maintained by hand
- 1335 - First known mechanical clock, in Milan
- 1502 - Peter Henlein builds the first pocketwatch
- 1522 - The Portuguese navigator Ferdinand Magellan used 18 hourglasses on each ship during his circumnavigation of the globe.

== Modern era ==
- 1656 - Christiaan Huygens builds the first accurate pendulum clock.
- 1676 - Daniel Quare, a London clock-maker, invents the repeating clock, that chimes the number of hours (or even minutes).
- 1680 - Second hand introduced
- 1737 - John Harrison presents the first stable marine chronometer, thereby allowing for precise longitude determination while at sea
- 1850 - Aaron Lufkin Dennison starts in the Waltham Watch Company and develops the American System of Watch Manufacturing in Roxbury, Massachusetts
- 1884 - International Meridian Conference adopts Greenwich Mean Time for consistency with Nevil Maskelyne's 18th century observations for the Method of Lunar Distances
- 1893 - Introduction by Webb C. Ball of the General Railroad Timepiece Standards in North America: Railroad chronometers
- 1921 - The Shortt-Synchronome free pendulum clock becomes the first clock more accurate than the rotation of the Earth
- 1927 - Joseph Horton and Warren Marrison describe the first quartz clock at Bell Telephone Laboratories.
- 1946 - Felix Bloch and Edward Purcell develop nuclear magnetic resonance
- 1949 - Harold Lyons develops an atomic clock based on the quantum mechanical vibrations of the ammonia molecule
- 1983 - Radio-controlled clocks become common place in Europe
- 1994 - Radio-controlled clocks become common place in USA

== Sources ==
- Barnett, Jo Ellen (1999). Time's Pendulum: From Sundials to Atomic Clocks, the Fascinating History of Timekeeping and How Our Discoveries Changed the World (1st ed.). San Diego: Harcourt Trade Publishers. ISBN 978-01560-0-649-1.
- Bergreen, Laurence (2003). Over the Edge of the World: Magellan's Terrifying Circumnavigation of the Globe. New York: Morrow. ISBN 978-0-06-621173-2.
- Dolan, Winthrop W. (1975). A Choice of Sundials. Brattleboro, Vermont: The Stephen Greene Press. ISBN 9780828902106. OCLC 471181086.
- Landes, David S. (1985). Revolution in Time: Clocks and the Making of the Modern World. Cambridge, Massachusetts: Harvard University Press. ISBN 9780674768024. OCLC 29148451.
- Marrison, Warren A. (1948). "The Evolution of the Quartz Crystal Clock". Bell System Technical Journal. 27 (3). New York: AT&T: 510–588. Bibcode:1948BSTJ...27..510M. doi:10.1002/j.1538-7305.1948.tb01343.x. OCLC 10999639. S2CID 88503681.
