= Muhammad ibn Abi Bakr al-Farisi =

Iranian Rasulid astronomer and astrologer

Muhammad ibn Abi Bakr al-Farisi (d. 1278/1279), an Iranian Rasulid astronomer and astrologer born in Aden. He is the author of al-Tuḥfa, which includes a treatise containing important information for the history of Islamic astronomy and its connection with the religion of Islam.
