= Warren Marrison =

Canadian engineer and inventor of the quartz clock

Warren A. Marrison
- Born: Warren Alvin Marrison; 21 May 1896; Inverary, Ontario, Canada
- Died: 27 March 1980 (aged 83); Palo Verdes Estates, California
- Education: Harvard University
- Known for: Quartz clock
- Scientific career
- Fields: Horology
- Workplaces: Bell Labs

Warren A. Marrison (21 May 1896 – 27 March 1980) was a Canadian engineer and inventor. Marrison was the co-inventor of the first Quartz clock in 1927.

== Early life and education ==
Marrison was born in Inverary, Frontenac county, Ontario. He studied at Queen's University in Kingston, Ontario, where he was part of a new program in engineering physics. He graduated in 1920 with a bachelor's degree in physics engineering; his studies were interrupted by World War I when he served in the Royal Flying Corps as a radio technician.

Beginning in 1921, he studied at Harvard University, ultimately receiving a master's degree. He worked at first for Western Electric in New York City, but moved to Bell Laboratories in New York beginning in 1925.

== Quartz clock ==
At Bell Labs in New York, Marrison was working on frequency standards using quartz as a reference. It was in 1927 that he developed the first quartz clock while working with J.W. Horton. The clock used a block of crystal, stimulated by electricity, to produce pulses at a frequency of 50,000 cycles per second. A submultiple controlled frequency generator then divided this down to a usable, regular pulse that drove a synchronous motor. While this first version of the clock was crude; Morrison produced a more refined version in 1928. A New York Times headline in October 1929 reported "Electrified Quartz Crystal Displaces Clock Pendulum".

== Legacy and awards ==
The invention would lead AT&T, the subsequent owners of Bell Labs, to develop a timepiece division called Frequency Control Products. This would eventually become the company Vectron International.

In 1947 Marrison was awarded a Gold Medal from the British Horological Institute. In 1955 the Clockmakers Company awarded him the Tompion Medal.

In 2011 Marrison was inducted into the Inventor's Hall of Fame.
