= Longitude rewards =

1714 British prize for ship's chronometers

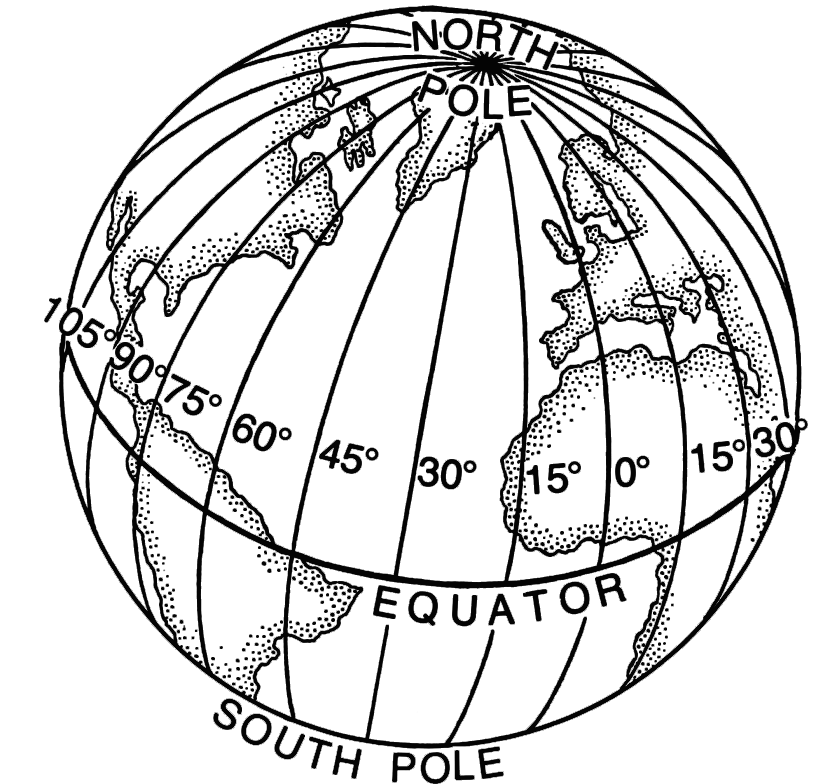
Longitude lines on the globe

The longitude rewards were the system of inducement prizes offered by the British government for a simple and practical method for the precise determination of a ship's longitude at sea. The prizes, established through an act of Parliament, the Longitude Act 1714 (13 Ann. c. 14), in 1714, were administered by the Board of Longitude.

This was by no means the first reward to be offered to solve this problem. Philip II of Spain offered one in 1567, Philip III in 1598 offered 6,000 ducats and a pension, whilst the States General of the Netherlands offered 10,000 florins shortly after. In 1675 Robert Hooke wanted to apply for a £1,000 reward in England for his invention of a spring-regulated watch. However, these large sums were never won, though several people were awarded smaller amounts for significant achievements.

== Background ==
The measurement of longitude was a problem that came into sharp focus as people began making transoceanic voyages. Determining latitude was relatively easy in that it could be found from the altitude of the sun at noon with the aid of a table giving the sun's declination for the day. (Note: Latitude can also be determined in the Northern Hemisphere from the angle above the horizon of Polaris, the northern pole star. However, since Polaris is not precisely at the pole, it can only estimate the latitude unless the precise time is known or many measurements are made over time. While many measurements can be made on land, this makes it impractical for determining latitude at sea.) For longitude, early ocean navigators had to rely on dead reckoning, based on calculations of the vessel's heading and speed for a given time (much of which was based on intuition on the part of the master and/or navigator). This was inaccurate on long voyages out of sight of land, and these voyages sometimes ended in tragedy. An accurate determination of longitude was also necessary to determine the proper "magnetic declination", that is, the difference between indicated magnetic north and true north, which can differ by up to 10 degrees in the important trade latitudes of the Atlantic and Indian Oceans. Finding an adequate solution to determining longitude at sea was therefore of paramount importance.

The Longitude Act 1714 (13 Ann. c. 14) only addressed the determination of longitude at sea. Determining longitude reasonably accurately on land was possible, from the 17th century onwards, using the Galilean moons of Jupiter as an astronomical 'clock'. The moons were easily observable on land, but numerous attempts to reliably observe them from the deck of a ship resulted in failure.

The need for better navigational accuracy for increasingly longer oceanic voyages had been an issue explored by many European nations for centuries before the passing of the Longitude Act 1714 in England. Portugal, Spain, and the Netherlands offered financial incentives for solutions to the problem of longitude as early as 1598.

Addressing the problem of longitude fell, primarily, into three categories: terrestrial, celestial, and mechanical. This included detailed atlases, lunar charts, and timekeeping mechanisms at sea. It is postulated by scholars that the economic gains and political power to be had in oceanic exploration, and not scientific and technological curiosity, is what resulted in the swift passing of the Longitude Act 1714 (13 Ann. c. 14) and the largest and most famous reward, the Longitude Prize being offered.

== Establishing the prizes ==
In the early 1700s, a series of maritime disasters occurred, including the wrecking of a squadron of naval vessels on the Isles of Scilly in 1707. Around the same time, mathematician Thomas Axe decreed in his will that a £1,000 prize be awarded for promising research into finding "true longitude" and that annual sums be paid to scholars involved in making corrected world maps.

In 1713, when the longitude proposal of William Whiston and Humphrey Ditton was presented at the opening of the session of Parliament, a general understanding of the longitude problem prompted the formation of a parliamentary committee and the swift passing of the Longitude Act on July 8, 1714. Within this act are detailed three prizes based on levels of accuracy, which are the same accuracy requirements used for the Axe prize, set by Whiston and Ditton in their petition, and recommended by Sir Isaac Newton and Edmund Halley to the parliamentary committee.

- £10,000 (equivalent to £1.62 million in 2023) for a method that could determine longitude within 1 degree (equivalent to 60 nautical miles (110 km; 69 mi) at the equator).
- £15,000 (equivalent to £2.42 million in 2023) for a method that could determine longitude within 40 minutes.
- £20,000 (equivalent to £3.23 million in 2023) for a method that could determine longitude within 30 minutes.

In addition, rewards were on offer for those who could produce a method that worked within 80 geographical miles of the coast (where ships would be in most danger), and for those with promising ideas who needed financial help to bring them to trial.

Proposed methods would be tested by sailing through the ocean, from Britain to any port in West Indies (about six weeks) without losing its longitude beyond the limits listed above. Also, the contender would be required to demonstrate the accuracy of their method by determining the longitude of a specific land-based feature whose longitude was already accurately known. The parliamentary committee also established the Board of Longitude. This panel of adjudicators would review proposed solutions and were also given authority to grant up to £2,000 in advances for promising projects that did not entirely fulfill the terms of the prize levels, but that were still found worthy of encouragement. The exact terms of the requirements for the prizes would later be contended by several recipients, including John Harrison. Ultimately, the £20,000 reward was not awarded to anyone in a lump sum, although John Harrison did receive a series of payments totaling £23,065. The Board of Longitude remained in existence for more than 100 years. When it was officially disbanded in 1828, an excess of £100,000 had been disbursed.

== Notable recipients ==
The Longitude Act offered a very large incentive for solutions to the longitude problem. Some later recipients of rewards, such as Euler and Mayer, made clear publicly that the money was not the incentive, but instead the important improvements to navigation and cartography. Other recipients, such as Kendall and Harrison had to appeal to the Board of Longitude and other governmental officials for adequate compensation for their work. Still others submitted radical and impractical theories, some of which can be seen in a collection at Harvard’s Houghton Library. Schemes and ideas for improvements to instruments and astronomy, both practical and impractical, can be seen among the digitised archives of the Board of Longitude.

Though the Board of Longitude did not award £20,000 at one time, they did offer sums to various individuals in recognition of their work for improvements in instrumentation or in published atlases and star charts.

=== List of awardees by amount ===
- John Harrison – £23,065 awarded overall after many years of contention with the Board ending in 1773.
- Thomas Mudge – £500 advance in 1777 for developing his marine timekeeper and a £3,000 award approved by a special committee in 1793 in recognition for his accomplishments.
- Tobias Mayer – £3,000 awarded to his widow for lunar distance tables, which were published in The National Almanac in 1766 and used by James Cook in his voyages.
- Thomas Earnshaw – £3,000 awarded for years of design and improvements made to chronometers.
- Charles Mason – £1,317 awarded for various contributions and improvements on Mayer’s lunar tables.
- Larcum Kendall – £800 total for his copy of and improvements and simplifications of Harrison’s sea watch (£500 for K1 – Kendall’s copy of Harrison’s H4, £200 for modified K2, and £100 for last modification model K3).
- Jesse Ramsden – £615 awarded for his engine-divided sextant with the requirement that he share his methods and the design with other instrument makers.
- John Arnold – £300 awarded in increments to improve his timekeeping design and experiments, though the accuracy required for the prize was never met.
- Leonhard Euler – £300 awarded for contributions to the lunar distance method in aid of Mayer.
- Nathaniel Davies – £300 awarded for the design of a lunar telescope for Mayer.

A full list of prizes made by the Commissioners and Board of Longitude was drawn up by Derek Howse, in an Appendix to his article on the finances of the Board of Longitude.

==== Other submissions ====
Only two women are known to have submitted proposals to the Longitude Commissioners, Elizabeth Johnson and Jane Squire. Incoming submissions can be found among the correspondence of the digitised papers of the Board of Longitude.

== John Harrison's contested reward ==
The winner of the most reward money under the Longitude Act is John Harrison for sea timekeepers, including his H4 sea watch. Harrison was 21 years old when the Longitude Act was passed. He spent the next 45 years perfecting the design of his timekeepers. He first received a reward from the Commissioners of Longitude in 1737 and did not receive his final payment until he was 80.

Harrison was first awarded £250 in 1737, in order to improve on his promising H1 sea clock, leading to the construction of H2. £2,000 was rewarded over the span of 1741–1755 for continued construction and completion of H2 and H3. From 1760 to 1765, Harrison received £2,865 for various expenses related to the construction, ocean trials, and eventual award for the performance of his sea watch H4. Despite the performance of the H4 exceeding the accuracy requirement of the highest reward possible in the original Longitude Act, Harrison was rewarded £7,500 (that is, £10,000 minus payments he had received in 1762 and 1764) once he had revealed the method of making his device, and was told that he must show that his single machine could be replicated before the final £10,000 could be paid.

Harrison made one rather than the requested two further copies of H4, and he and his family members eventually appealed to King George III after petitions for further rewards were not answered by the Board of Longitude. A reward of £8,750 was granted by Parliament in 1773 for a total payment of £23,065 spanning thirty-six years.

== See also ==
- History of longitude
- Nevil Maskelyne
- Lunar distance (navigation)
- Celatone
- List of engineering awards
