= Humphry Ditton =

English mathematician (1675–1715)

Humphry Ditton (29 May 1675 – 15 October 1715) was an English mathematician. He was the author of several influential works.

== Life ==
Ditton was born on 29 May 1675 in Salisbury, the only son of Humphry Ditton, gentleman and ardent nonconformist, and Miss Luttrell of Dunster Castle, near Taunton. He studied theology privately, and was for some time also a dissenting minister, at Tonbridge, where he married a Miss Ball.

On his father's death, Ditton devoted himself mainly to the study of mathematics. Through the influence of Isaac Newton he was elected mathematical master in Christ's Hospital. He produced also a theological work, A Discourse Concerning the Resurrection of Jesus Christ, which sought to take a mathematical, deductive approach to the subject. The first of its four editions appeared in 1712 and it was translated into French and German. He was unable to complete his response to various criticisms of the work before his death.

A diary containing Ditton's religious meditations appeared posthumously in the Gospel Magazine (September 1777, pp. 393–403; December 1777, pp. 437–441).

== Works ==
He was author of the following memoirs and treatises:

- Of the Tangents of Curves, published in Philosophical Transactions vol. xxiii;
- A Treatise on Spherical Catoptrics, published in the Phil. Trans. vol. xxiv, from which it was reprinted in the Acta Eruditorum (1707), and also in the Memoirs of the Academy of Sciences at Paris;
- General Laws of Nature and Motion (1705), a work which was commended by Wolfius as illustrating and rendering easier the writings of Galileo Galilei and Christiaan Huygens, and
- Principia of Newton; An Institution of Fluxions, containing the First Principles, Operations, and Applications of that admirable Method, as invented by Sir Isaac Newton (1706).

In 1709 he published the Synopsis Algebraica of John Alexander, with additions and corrections. In his Treatise on Perspective (1712) he explained his mathematical principles; and anticipated the method afterwards elaborated by Brook Taylor.

In 1714 Ditton published his Discourse on the Resurrection of Jesus Christ, and The New Law of Fluids, or a Discourse concerning the Ascent of Liquids in exact Geometrical Figures, between two nearly contiguous Surfaces. To this was annexed a tract ("Matter not a Cogitative Substance") to demonstrate the impossibility of thinking or perception being the result of any combination of the parts of matter and motion.

Ditton and William Whiston wrote a book, called A new method for discovering the longitude both at sea and land, concerning a method for discovering the longitude, which it seems they had published about half a year earlier. Although the method had been approved by Newton before being presented to the Board of Longitude, and successfully practised in finding the longitude between Paris and Vienna, the board determined against it. Jonathan Swift wrote mockingly about this plan.

Ditton died in the following year, and was buried in Christ Church Greyfriars in central London.
