= Lunar distance (navigation) =

Angular distance between the Moon and another celestial body

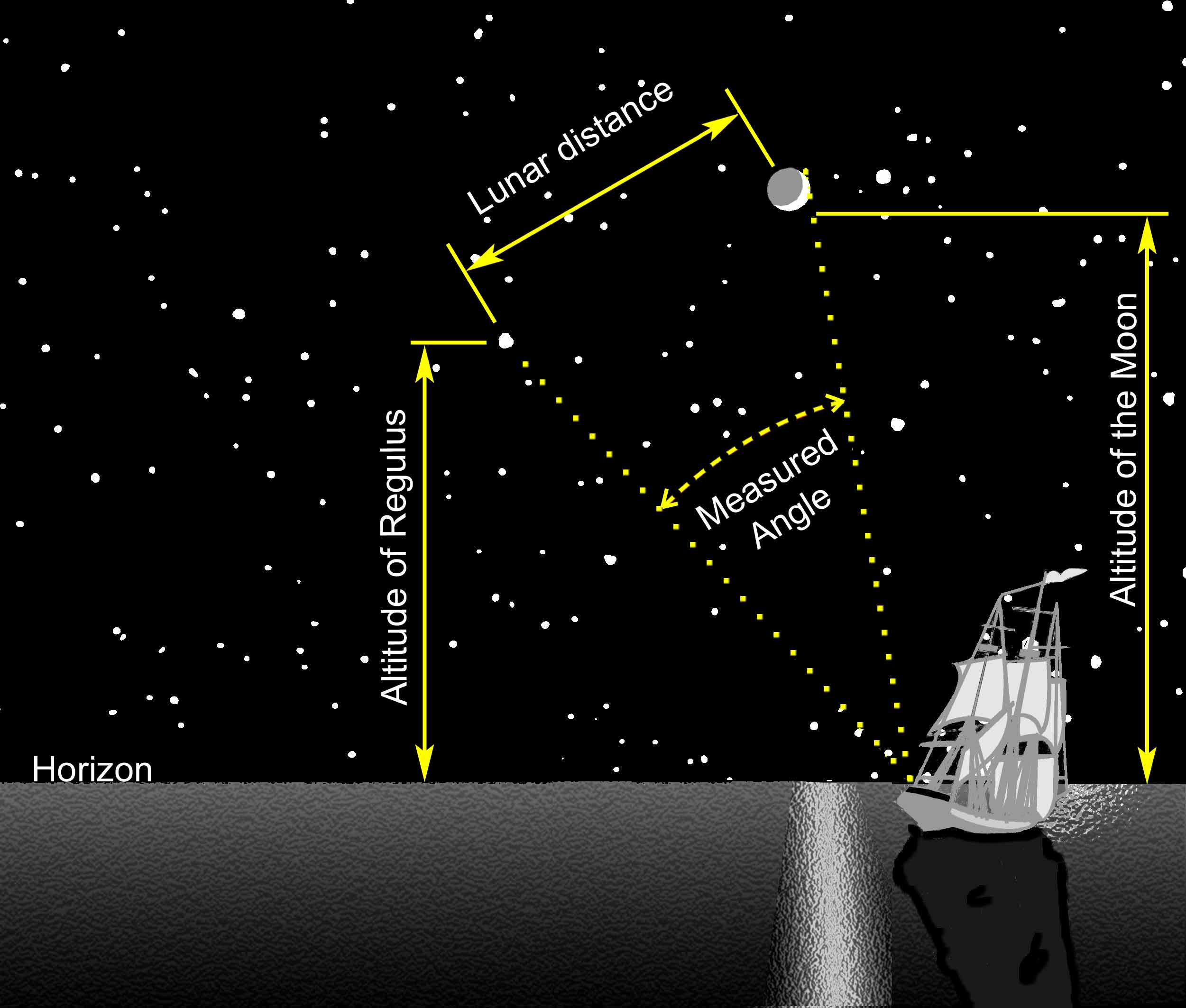
Finding Greenwich time while at sea using a lunar distance. The lunar distance is the angle between the Moon and a star (e.g., the Sun). In the above illustration the star Regulus is used. The altitudes of the two bodies are used to make corrections and determine the time.

In celestial navigation, lunar distance, also called a lunar, is the angular distance between the Moon and another celestial body. The lunar distances method uses this angle and a nautical almanac to calculate Greenwich time if so desired, or by extension any other time. That calculated time can be used in solving a spherical triangle. The theory was first published by Johannes Werner in 1524, before the necessary almanacs had been published. A fuller method was published in 1763 and used until about 1850 when it was superseded by the marine chronometer. A similar method uses the positions of the Galilean moons of Jupiter.

== Purpose ==
In celestial navigation, knowledge of the time at Greenwich (or another known place) and the measured positions of one or more celestial objects allows the navigator to calculate longitude. Reliable marine chronometers were unavailable until the late 18th century and not affordable until the 19th century. After the method was first published in 1763 by British Astronomer Royal Nevil Maskelyne, based on pioneering work by Tobias Mayer, for about a hundred years (until about 1850) mariners lacking a chronometer used the method of lunar distances to determine Greenwich time as a key step in determining longitude. Conversely, a mariner with a chronometer could check its accuracy using a lunar determination of Greenwich time. The method saw usage all the way up to the beginning of the 20th century on smaller vessels that could not afford a chronometer or had to rely on this technique for correction of the chronometer.

== Method ==
=== Summary ===
The method relies on the relatively quick movement of the moon across the background sky, completing a circuit of 360 degrees in 27.3 days (the sidereal month), or 13.2 degrees per day. In one hour it will move approximately half a degree, roughly its own angular diameter, with respect to the background stars and the Sun.

Using a sextant, the navigator precisely measures the angle between the moon and another body. That could be the Sun or one of a selected group of bright stars lying close to the Moon's path, near the ecliptic. At that moment, anyone on the surface of the earth who can see the same two bodies will, after correcting for parallax, observe the same angle. The navigator then consults a prepared table of lunar distances and the Greenwich times at which they will occur. By comparing the corrected lunar distance with the tabulated values, the navigator finds the Greenwich time for that observation. Knowing Greenwich time and local time, the navigator can work out longitude.

Local time can be determined from a sextant observation of the altitude of the Sun or a star. Then the longitude (relative to Greenwich) is readily calculated from the difference between local time and Greenwich Time, at 15 degrees per hour of difference.

=== In practice ===
Having measured the lunar distance and the heights of the two bodies, the navigator can find Greenwich time in three steps:

1. Preliminaries: Almanac tables predict lunar distances between the centre of the Moon and the other body (published between 1767 and 1906 in Britain). However, the observer cannot accurately find the centre of the Moon (or Sun, which was the most frequently used second object). Instead, lunar distances are always measured to the sharply lit, outer edge (the limb, not terminator) of the Moon (or of the Sun). The first correction to the lunar distance is the distance between the limb of the Moon and its center. Since the Moon's apparent size varies with its varying distance from the Earth, almanacs give the Moon's and Sun's semidiameter for each day. Additionally the observed altitudes are cleared of semidiameter.
2. Clearing: The lunar distance is corrected for the effects of parallax and atmospheric refraction on the observation. The almanac gives lunar distances as they would appear if the observer were at the center of a transparent Earth. Because the Moon is so much closer to the Earth than the stars are, the position of the observer on the surface of the Earth shifts the relative position of the Moon by up to an entire degree. The clearing correction for parallax and refraction is a trigonometric function of the observed lunar distance and the altitudes of the two bodies. Navigators used collections of mathematical tables to work these calculations by any of dozens of distinct clearing methods. For practical applications today the tables by Bruce Stark may be used for clearing the lunar distance. They are constructed such that only additions and subtractions of tabulated numbers are required instead of trigonometric evaluations.
3. Finding the time: The navigator, having cleared the lunar distance, now consults a prepared table of lunar distances and the Greenwich times at which they will occur in order to determine the Greenwich time of the observation. Predicting the position of the moon years in advance requires solving the three-body problem, since the earth, moon and sun were all involved. Euler developed the numerical method they used, called Euler's method, and received a grant from the Board of Longitude to carry out the computations.

Having found the (absolute) Greenwich time, the navigator either compares it with the observed local apparent time (a separate observation) to find his longitude, or compares it with the Greenwich time on a chronometer (if available) if one wants to check the chronometer.

== Errors ==
=== Almanac error ===
By 1810, the errors in the almanac predictions had been reduced to about one-quarter of a minute of arc. By about 1860 (after lunar distance observations had mostly faded into history), the almanac errors were finally reduced to less than the error margin of a sextant in ideal conditions (one-tenth of a minute of arc).

=== Lunar distance observation ===
Later sextants (after c. 1800) could indicate angle to 0.1 arc-minutes, after the use of the vernier was popularized by its description in English in the book Navigatio Britannica published in 1750 by John Barrow, the mathematician and historian. In practice at sea, actual errors were somewhat larger. If the sky is cloudy or the Moon is new (hidden close to the glare of the Sun), lunar distance observations could not be performed.

=== Total error ===
A lunar distance changes with time at a rate of roughly half a degree, or 30 arc-minutes, in an hour. The two sources of error, combined, typically amount to about one-half arc-minute in lunar distance, equivalent to one minute in Greenwich time, which corresponds to an error of as much as one-quarter of a degree of longitude, or about 15 nautical miles (28 km) at the equator.

== In literature ==
Captain Joshua Slocum, in making the first solo circumnavigation of the Earth in 1895–1898, somewhat anachronistically used the lunar method along with dead reckoning in his navigation. He comments in Sailing Alone Around the World on a sight taken in the South Pacific. After correcting an error he found in his log tables, the result was surprisingly accurate:

I found from the result of three observations, after long wrestling with lunar tables, that her longitude agreed within five miles of that by dead-reckoning. This was wonderful; both, however, might be in error, but somehow I felt confident that both were nearly true, and that in a few hours more I should see land; and so it happened, for then I made out the island of Nukahiva, the southernmost of the Marquesas group, clear-cut and lofty. The verified longitude when abreast was somewhere between the two reckonings; this was extraordinary. All navigators will tell you that from one day to another a ship may lose or gain more than five miles in her sailing-account, and again, in the matter of lunars, even expert lunarians are considered as doing clever work when they average within eight miles of the truth...

The result of these observations naturally tickled my vanity, for I knew it was something to stand on a great ship’s deck and with two assistants take lunar observations approximately near the truth. As one of the poorest of American sailors, I was proud of the little achievement alone on the sloop, even by chance though it may have been...

The work of the lunarian, though seldom practised in these days of chronometers, is beautifully edifying, and there is nothing in the realm of navigation that lifts one’s heart up more in adoration.

In his 1777 book, A Voyage Round the World, naturalist Georg Forster described his impressions of navigation with captain James Cook on board the ship HMS Resolution in the South Pacific. Cook had two of the new chronometers on board, one made by Larcum Kendall the other by John Arnold, following the lead of the famous John Harrison clocks. On March 12, 1774, approaching Easter Island, Forster found praiseworthy the method of lunar distances as the best and most precise method to determine longitude, as compared to clocks which may fail due to mechanical problems.

== See also ==
- Royal Observatory, Greenwich
- Josef de Mendoza y Ríos
- John Harrison
- History of longitude
- Longitude prize
- Henry Raper
- Bowditch's American Practical Navigator
- Nathaniel Bowditch
