= John Jefferys (clockmaker) =

English clockmaker and watchmaker

John Jefferys (1701 – 1754) was an English clockmaker and watchmaker.

His parents, John and Jane Jefferys, lived in a house called Darbies in the village of Midgham in the parish of Thatcham in Berkshire. His father was a wool merchant. His maternal grandparents were William and Bridgett Yeats. He had at least five brothers and one sister. Although his father was a Quaker, he was christened on 18 March 1701.

On 4 November 1717, he began an apprenticeship with watchmaker Edward Jagger at Well Close Square, Stepney, London. After nine years of teaching, on 26 January 1726, he became a member of the Clockmakers Company of London. In 1735, Larcum Kendall was a new apprentice. Around 1753, he built a pocketwatch for clockmaker John Harrison. This watch was unusually accurate and became the prototype for Harrison's longitude prize winning watch H4. After he died, Larcum Kendall took over his workshop.

== In popular media ==
Actor Peter-Hugo Daly was cast as John Jefferys in the Channel 4 TV series Longitude in 2000.
