= Foulby =

Coordinates: 53.654635°N 1.398469°W

- Location within West Yorkshire
- Metropolitan borough: City of Wakefield
- Metropolitan county: West Yorkshire
- Region: Yorkshire and the Humber
- Country: England
- Sovereign state: United Kingdom
- Post town: WAKEFIELD
- Postcode district: WF4
- Dialling code: 01924
- Police: West Yorkshire
- Fire: West Yorkshire
- Ambulance: Yorkshire
- UK Parliament: Normanton, Pontefract and Castleford

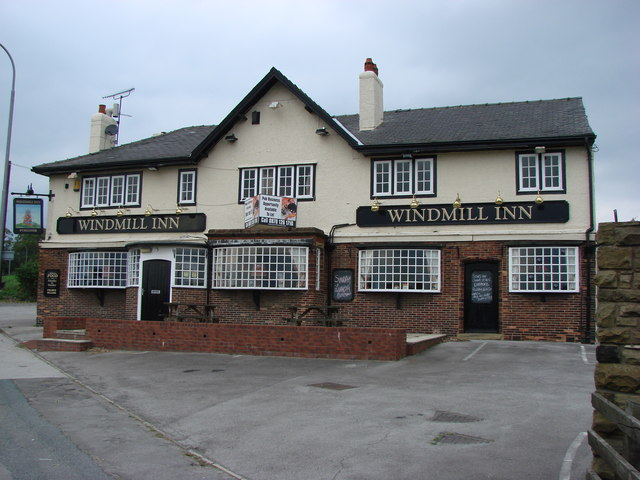
The Windmill Inn in Foulby.

Foulby is a village in the City of Wakefield district of West Yorkshire, England. It is situated near Nostell, between Crofton and Ackworth Moor Top, on the A638 east-south east of the city of Wakefield. The village is in the Ackworth, North Elmsall and Upton ward of Wakefield Council.

The boundary between the civil parishes of Huntwick with Foulby and Nostell (to the south-east) and Sharlston (to the north-west) passes through the village.

John Harrison (24 March 1693 – 24 March 1776) an English carpenter and clock designer, who solved the problem of calculating longitude through the carrying of precise time on board ship, was born in the village. A blue plaque is displayed on the house where he was born beside the main Wakefield to Doncaster road. Windmill Inn, the site of a former windmill designed by John Smeaton in 1786, is now an Indian restaurant called Arkaan's.
