= Robert Davy =

English painter

- Born: Cullompton, Devonshire
- Died: 28 September 1793
- Occupation: Painter

Robert Davy (died 28 September 1793) was an English portrait painter.

== Biography ==
Davy was born at Cullompton, Devonshire, and began art as a portrait-painter, going, when young, to Rome to educate himself. About 1760 he returned to England, and settled in London as a drawing-master at a ladies' school in Queen Square; subsequently he was appointed under drawing-master to the Royal Military Academy at Woolwich. He painted principally portraits, and mostly miniatures; many of these he exhibited at the exhibitions of the Free Society of Artists from 1762 to 1768, and the Royal Academy from 1771 to 1782. He did not, however, attain any great repute. He resided in the latter portion of his life in John Street, Tottenham Court Road; in September 1793 he was returning home one night when he was knocked down and robbed near his own door, and died after a few days on 28 September. He sometimes copied pictures, and a small copy made by him of Benjamin West's ‘Death of General Wolfe’ attracted attention. A portrait by him of John Arnold, watchmaker, was engraved in mezzotint by Susan Esther Reid.
