= John Arnold (watchmaker) =

English watchmaker and inventor

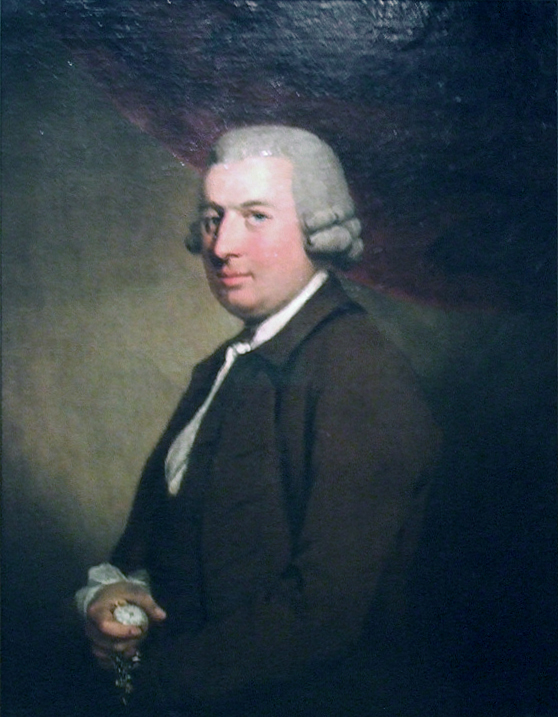
- Portrait of Arnold by Robert Davy
- Born: 1736; Bodmin, England
- Died: 11 August 1799 (aged 62–63); Well Hall, England
- Occupations: Watchmaker, inventor
- Organization(s): Arnold & Son, Breguet
- Children: John Roger Arnold

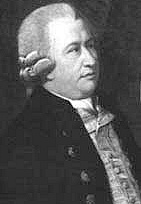
Portrait of Arnold by Robert Davy

John Arnold (1736 – 11 August 1799) was an English watchmaker and inventor.

Arnold was the first to design a watch that was both practical and accurate, and also brought the term "chronometer" into use in its modern sense, meaning a precision timekeeper. His technical advances enabled the quantity production of marine chronometers for use on board ships from around 1782. The basic design of these has remained with a few modifications unchanged until the late twentieth century. His legacy includes, together with Abraham-Louis Breguet, being one of the inventors of the modern mechanical watch. One of his most important inventions, the overcoil balance spring, is still used in most mechanical wristwatches.

It was from around 1770 that Arnold developed the portable precision timekeeper, almost from the point where John Harrison ended his work in this field. But, compared to Harrison's complicated and expensive watch, Arnold's basic design was simple whilst consistently accurate and mechanically reliable. Importantly, the relatively simple and conventional design of his movement facilitated its production in quantity at a reasonable price whilst also enabling easier maintenance and adjustment.

Three elements were necessary for this achievement:

- A detached escapement, which gave minimal interference with the vibrating balance and balance spring
- A balance design that enabled compensation for the effect of temperature on the balance spring
- A method for adjusting the balance spring, so that the balance oscillates in equal time periods, even through different degrees of balance arc

== Early life and work ==
Born 1736, in Bodmin, Arnold was apprenticed to his father, also a clockmaker, in Bodmin in Cornwall. He probably also worked with his uncle, a gunsmith. Around 1755, when he was 19, he left England and worked as a watchmaker in the Hague, Holland, returning to England around 1757.

In 1762, whilst at St Albans, Hertfordshire, he encountered William McGuire for whom he repaired a repeating watch. Arnold made a sufficient impression so that McGuire gave him a loan, enabling him to set up in business as a watchmaker at Devereux Court, Strand, London. In 1764, Arnold obtained permission to present to King George III an exceptionally small half quarter repeating watch cylinder escapement watch mounted in a ring. A similar repeating watch by Arnold has survived; it is of interest that the basic movement is Swiss in origin but finished in London. The escapement of this watch was later fitted with one of the first jewelled cylinders made of ruby.

Arnold made another watch for the King around 1768, which was a gold and enamel pair cased watch with a movement that had every refinement, including minute repetition and centre seconds motion. In addition, Arnold fitted bi-metallic temperature compensation, and not only was every pivot hole jewelled but the escapement also had a stone cylinder made of ruby or sapphire. Arnold designated this watch "Number 1", as he did with all watches he made that he regarded as significant, these numbering twenty in all.

Other early productions by Arnold from 1768 to 1770 display both originality and ingenuity; this includes a centre seconds watch wound up by depressing the pendant once a day. The movement of this watch was also fully jewelled with a temperature compensation device and a ruby stone cylinder escapement.

These watches were made as demonstrations of Arnold's talent and, in terms of style and substance, were similar to other "conversation pieces" being made at the same time as those being produced for James Cox and made primarily for export to the East.

=== Technical challenge ===
Arnold's facility and ingenuity, coupled with his undoubted charm brought him to the attention of the Astronomer Royal Nevil Maskelyne, who at this time was seeking a watchmaker skilled enough to make a copy of John Harrison's successful marine timekeeper. A full and detailed description of this watch was published by the Board of Longitude in 1767, entitled "The Principles of Mr. Harrison's Timekeeper", the intention clearly being for it to act as a blueprint for future quantity production. In fact, it was a highly complex and technically very advanced piece of micro engineering, and capable of being reproduced by less than a handful of watchmakers. However, the challenge was taken up by Larcum Kendall, who spent two years making a near identical copy (now known as K1) that cost £450, a huge sum at the time. Although successful as a precision timekeeper, the Admiralty for obvious reasons wanted a timekeeper on every major ship, and Kendall's was too expensive and took too long to make. Kendall made a simplified version (K2) in 1771, leaving out the complicated remontoir system. But the result was still too costly and, moreover, not as accurate as the original.

In retrospect therefore, it was a significant occasion when in 1767, Nevil Maskelyne presented John Arnold with a copy of the "Principles of Mr. Harrison's Timekeeper" as soon as it was published, evidently with a view to encourage him to make a precision timekeeper of the same kind. Maskelyne subsequently encouraged Arnold by employing him on several occasions, mostly in connection with watch and clock jewelling. In 1769, Arnold modified Maskelyne's centre seconds watch by John Ellicott, changing the cylinder escapement from steel to one made of sapphire. He lent this watch to the Astronomer William Wales for use in assessing the practicability of Maskelyne's Lunar distance method for finding the ship's longitude during the voyage of the Transit of Venus expedition to the West Indies in 1769. Around this time, Arnold also seems to have started to think about making an accurate timekeeper to find the longitude.

=== First "Watch Machines" ===
Arnold's approach to precision timekeeping was completely different from that of Harrison, whose technical ethos was rooted in seventeenth- and early eighteenth-century theory and practice. Arnold knew that as the balance and balance spring control the timekeeping in a portable watch. He only needed to find a way of giving the balance a consistent impulse with minimal interference from the wheel work, together with an effective temperature compensation. After making some experimental machines, he produced what could be regarded as a production model to the Board of Longitude in March 1771.

This machine was completely different from Harrison's watch. It was a mahogany box of approximately 6 by 6 by 3 inches (152 mm × 152 mm × 76 mm) that housed a movement that, though relatively simple, was close to the same size as Harrison's, with a balance of a similar diameter. The radical difference, however, was a newly designed escapement that featured a horizontally placed pivoted detent that allowed the balance to vibrate freely, except when impulsed by the escape wheel. The spiral balance spring also had a temperature compensation device similar to those in Arnold's watches and based on Harrison's bimetallic strip of brass and steel. Arnold proposed manufacture of these timekeepers at 60 guineas each.

Three of these timekeepers travelled with the explorers James Cook and Captain Furneaux during their second voyage to the southern Pacific Ocean from 1772 to 1775. Cook also had Kendall's first timekeeper on board as well as one of Arnold's. Whereas Kendall's performed very well and kept excellent time during the voyage, only one of Arnold's was still running on their return to England in 1775. The performance of these clocks was recorded in the logbooks of astronomers William Wales and William Bayly who were assessing their suitability for measuring longitude. Additionally, the log of HMS Providence by Captain William Robert Broughton mentions "Arnold's box time-piece keeps so uncertain a rate as to render it useless." Broughton claimed that the time piece gained 0".419 per day on 10 April 1797. Several months later, on 21 October 1797, the time piece had degraded in effectiveness and was losing 9".800 per day.

During this period, Arnold also made at least one precision pocket watch: a miniature version of the larger marine timekeepers.

This surviving watch dates from around 1769–1770 and is signed Arnold No. 1 Invenit et Fecit (Latin for 'invented and made'). The movement, which indicates centre seconds, has a steel balance with a bimetallic temperature compensation strip that acts on the flat balance spring. Though now altered, the original escapement was Arnold's horizontal pivoted detent as fitted to the larger timekeepers, which was, it seems, not entirely successful and needed improvements.

Around 1772, Arnold modified this escapement so that it now was pivoted vertically and acted on by a spring. This was a much more successful arrangement, and it is known that in 1772 at least two pocket timekeepers with this escapement were supplied to Joseph Banks at a cost of £100 (Arnold No.5), and also Banks' fellow Etonian Captain Constantine John Phipps, 2nd Baron Mulgrave. In a long and detailed article on this matter, published in Australiana November 2014 Vol 36 No. 4, John Hawkins details the association between these two men and the imagined possibility that this instrument is one and the same. The world's first pocket chronometer originally destined for Cook's second voyage, purchased by Banks and lent to Phipps, is known to have been a small centre seconds watch of a similar kind to those made by Ellicott. In 1773, Captain Phipps made a voyage to the North Pole, taking with him not only his Arnold pocket timekeeper and an Arnold box timekeeper in gimbals, but also Kendall's "K2" timekeeper. From Phipps's account, it appears that the pocket watch performed very well indeed and was a convenient instrument for ascertaining the longitude.

It seems likely that before 1775, Arnold's earliest pocket chronometers, such as those supplied to Phipps and Banks, were plain watches with centre seconds motion, largely resembling Maskelyne's cylinder watch by Ellicott. Certainly, those few surviving examples are of this caliper such as No. 3.

By 1772, Arnold had finalized the design of his pocket timekeepers and started series production with a standardized movement caliper, this being around 50 mm in diameter, larger than a conventional watch of the period, and showing seconds with a pivoted detent escapement and spiral compensation curb. However, the latter appears to have proved ineffective, which seems to have substantially slowed the rate of production.

Even though he produced a number of pocket timekeepers, from around 1772–1778, Arnold was still experimenting with different types of compensation balance and methods of balance spring adjustment. The most difficult problem to surmount was the problem of making an effective and continuously adjustable temperature compensation device. For technical reasons, the temperature compensation for the balance spring had to somehow be incorporated into the balance itself and not act on the balance spring directly as had been done previously by Arnold and others.

=== First patent ===
In 1775, Arnold took out a patent for a new form of compensation balance with a bimetallic spiral at the centre. This spiral actuated two weighted arms, making them move in and out from the centre, changing the radius of gyration, and thus the period of oscillation.

In the same patent, he included a new helical balance spring. This shape reduced lateral thrust on the balance pivots as they rotated, and reduced random errors from the "point of attachment" effect, which any balance with a flat spring suffers from. As Arnold stated rather succinctly in a 1782 letter to the Board of Longitude, "...the power in all parts of the spring is uniform."

The fact that Arnold had recognized the technical advantages of a balance spring of this form clearly demonstrates a high degree of insight. The balance that was the subject of the patent appears to have been an unsuccessful design. Certainly, some marine chronometers used this balance, but none have survived. Pearson records a balance of this kind in his possession that was 2.4 inches in diameter.

From 1772 to 1775, Arnold also made about 35 pocket timekeepers. Not many, about ten of these, survive and none in their original form, as Arnold was constantly upgrading their specification. They appear to have originally had a pivoted detent escapement, with a steel balance and a helical balance spring. A spiral bimetallic curb acting on this spring was intended to provide the temperature compensation, but this system evidently did not work, as every watch was subsequently altered and improved by Arnold shortly afterwards. Surviving chronometers from this series include Numbers 3, 29 and 28.

Further experimentation and invention by Arnold led to a breakthrough in the late 1770s. He redesigned the compensation balance and developed two designs that showed promise. Known as the "T" and "S" balances, and marked as such in Arnold's 1782 patent (probably because of their appearance), both employed bimetallic strips of brass and steel with weights attached, which changed the radius of gyration with change in temperature. Although these probably needed a lot of adjustment, they appear to have worked well compared to his previous attempts at a compensation balance.

=== Watch innovation ===
Around 1777, Arnold redesigned his chronometer, making it larger in order to accommodate the new "T" balance that worked with his pivoted detent escapement and patented helical spring. The first chronometer of this pattern was signed "Invenit et Fecit" and given the fractional number 1 over 36, as it was the first of this new design.

It is generally known as Arnold 36 and was, in fact, the first watch that Arnold called a chronometer, a term that subsequently came into general use and still means any highly accurate watch. The Royal Observatory, Greenwich tested Arnold 36 for thirteen months, from 1 February 1779 to 6 July 1780. The testers placed it in several positions during the trial, and even wore it and carried it around. The watch exceeded all expectations, as it demonstrated great accuracy. The timekeeping error was 2 minutes 32.2 seconds, but the error in the last nine months amounted to just one minute. The greatest error in any 24 hours was only four seconds, or one nautical mile of longitude at the equator.

Subsequently, Arnold produced a pamphlet that detailed the trial and results, with attestations of veracity from all those concerned with the tests. Maskelyne's assistant, the Rev. John Hellins, was in charge of the pamphlet. The astonishing performance of this watch caused controversy, because many thought the result was either a fluke or a "fix" of some kind, particularly as Maskelyne was, effectively, one of Arnold's patrons.

From a technical point of view, however, the design was entirely sound and highly accurate over long periods. Arnold evidently learned the lessons that Harrison had learned before him—using a large, quickly oscillating balance (18,000 beats per hour) with small pivots. Arnold's detent escapement provided minimal interference with the controlling helical balance spring, since the temperature compensation was in the balance itself. Harrison had suggested this as a prerequisite, though he never developed the idea. Arnold's pivoted detent escapement did not need oil on acting surfaces, with the advantage that the rate of action did not deteriorate, and remained stable for long periods. At the time, only vegetable oil was available, which degraded quickly compared to modern lubricants.

This chronometer, 60 mm in diameter, is housed in a gold case, and miraculously has survived in perfect and original condition. It can be seen in the collections of the National Maritime Museum, Greenwich, London, having been saved for the nation in 1993.

In Britain, prior to Harrison's marine watch, a small, or very small watch (such as Arnold's ring watch) was generally regarded as the ultimate test of watchmaking skill, especially with regard to complex and accurate watches. Both Harrison and Arnold however, demonstrated that an accurate watch had to be of large diameter, so by the end of the 18th century, a watch of large size was considered the primary characteristic of a well-made and superior watch.

=== Second patent ===
In 1782, Arnold took out another patent to protect the latest and most important inventions, which were potentially lucrative. Several other watchmakers, most notably Thomas Earnshaw, had started to copy Arnold's work. Around 1780, Earnshaw modified his detent escapement by mounting the detent on a spring to create the spring detent escapement.

During the same period, between 1779 and 1782, Arnold finalized the form of his chronometer watches. Through continuous experimentation, he worked out a way to make an effective but simple form of compensation balance. At the same time, he discovered a simple modification to his helical balance spring that let develop concentrically and, also, confer the property of isochronism on the oscillating balance. Not only this, but adjustments to the compensation balance and the balance spring could be carried out in a simple, calculated way. These were the main subjects of the patent, which he took out in 1782.

The balance consisted of a circular steel balance wheel with two bimetallic strips attached diametrically. Each bimetallic strip terminated with a screw thread mounted with a weight or balance nut. The further along the strip this nut was screwed, the greater the compensating effect. Another part of the patent concerned an addition to the form of the balance spring—a coil of smaller radius at each end of the helical spring, which offered increasing resistance to the rotating balance as it turned towards the end of each vibration. This was an important invention, as it largely eliminated the problem of the positional adjustment of balance controlled watches. This device, known as the Overcoil balance spring, is still used today in most precision mechanical watches.

Another part of the patent concerned the escapement—a modification of Arnold's pivoted detent escapement that essentially mounted the detent on a spring. The specification only shows the part of this escapement that is the method of impulse on the impulse roller.

A 1794 John Arnold pocket chronometer, No. 485/786, substantially rebuilt in 1840, was used by the Belville family from 1835 to 1940 to distribute accurate time to users in London. It had been made, with a gold case, for the Duke of Sussex, who rejected it because it "looked like a bedpan". When Ruth Belville, the "Greenwich time lady", died in 1943 the watch was left to the Worshipful Company of Clockmakers.

=== Patents and plagiarism ===
The fact that Arnold had gained great success by modifying the technology of the timekeeper by means of simple yet effective mechanical techniques also meant that other watchmakers could copy these methods and use them without permission. This is why Arnold took out his patents.

Two other makers also made precision watches with the detached escapement: Josiah Emery and John Brockbank. Both were friends of Arnold, and both employed the highly skilled workman and escapement maker Thomas Earnshaw. Josiah Emery used, with Arnold's permission, an earlier form of his compensation balance and helical balance spring, in conjunction with the detached lever escapement of Thomas Mudge. John Brockbank employed Earnshaw to make his pattern of chronometer, but with Brockbank's design of compensation balance.

In 1780, while making these chronometers for Brockbank, Earnshaw modified the pivoted detent by mounting the locking piece on a spring, thus dispensing with the pivots. Arnold managed to see this new idea and promptly took out the 1782 patent for his own design of spring detent, but it is not known whether this preceded Earnshaw's own idea.

Therefore, there has been a great deal of debate over who invented the spring detent escapement, Arnold or Earnshaw. This argument, first initiated by Earnshaw, has been continued by horological historians (such as Rupert Gould) to the present day. However, the argument is irrelevant. In recent years, research has established that Arnold's success was not due to the form of detent escapement, but to his original methods of adjusting the balance spring for positional errors by manipulating the overcoil terminal curve. For obvious reasons, Arnold tried to keep these methods secret; certainly it is recorded that he clearly expressed his concerns about possible plagiarism to Earnshaw, warning him in no uncertain terms not to use his Helical balance spring.

Nevertheless, a year later, in 1783, Earnshaw—through another watchmaker, Thomas Wright—took out a patent that included Earnshaw's pattern of integral compensation balance and spring detent escapement in the multiple specification. However, both of these were undeveloped and compared to Arnold's were of little use, the balance especially having to be redesigned.

Eventually, after much argument, the Board of Longitude granted Earnshaw and Arnold awards for their improvements to chronometers. Earnshaw received £2500 and John Arnold's son, John Roger Arnold, received £1672. The bimetallic compensation balance and the spring detent escapement in the forms designed by Earnshaw have been used essentially universally in marine chronometers since then. For this reason, Earnshaw is also generally regarded as one of the pioneers of chronometer development.

However, because Arnold's balance spring patents were in force (each for 14 years), Earnshaw could not use the helical balance spring until the 1775 patent lapsed in 1789, and, in the case of the 1782 patent, 1796. Until around 1796, Earnshaw made watches with flat balance springs only, but after 1800 practically every marine chronometer, including those by Earnshaw, had a helical spring with terminal overcoils.

Arnold was the first to produce marine and pocket chronometers in significant quantities at his factory at Well Hall, Eltham from around 1783. During the next 14 or 15 years, he produced hundreds before he had any kind of commercial competition. These indicate that authors such as Gould and Sobel are incorrect in their assertion that there was commercial rivalry between Arnold Sr. and Earnshaw.

== Relationship with Arnold and Breguet ==
The important Swiss French watchmaker Abraham-Louis Breguet became a great friend of Arnold. In 1792, the Duke of Orleans met Arnold in London and showed him one of Breguet's clocks. Arnold was so impressed that he immediately travelled to Paris and sought permission for Breguet to take on his son as his apprentice. Arnold appears to have given Breguet carte blanche to incorporate or develop any of Arnold's inventions and techniques into his own watches.

These included his balance designs, helical springs made of steel or gold, the spring detent escapement, the overcoil balance spring, and even the layout of an Arnold dial design that Breguet incorporated into his own. These were made from engine-turned gold or silver—a pattern that became the classic and distinctive Breguet dial. Arnold's pattern first appeared in 1783, on the enamel dials Arnold designed for his small chronometers, and the proportions and layout of their figuring is identical to that of the classic "Breguet" type of engine-turned metal dials which appeared around 1800, and which were quite unlike anything else made in France or Switzerland at the time.

=== Arnold and the 'tourbillon' ===
Arnold also appears to have been the first to think of the concept of the tourbillon; this must have derived from his known work on the recognition and elimination of positional errors. In the tourbillon device, the balance and escapement is continuously rotated and virtually eliminates errors arising from the balance wheel not being perfectly balanced whilst in vertical positions. Arnold appears to have experimented with this idea but died in 1799, before he could develop it further. It is known that Breguet made a successful and practical tourbillon mechanism around 1795 but, nevertheless, he acknowledged Arnold as the inventor by presenting his first tourbillon in 1808 to Arnold's son John Roger. As a tribute to his friend Arnold Sr., he incorporated his first tourbillon mechanism into one of Arnold's early pocket chronometers, Arnold No.11. An engraved commemorative inscription on this watch reads:

"The first Tourbillon timekeeper by Breguet incorporated into one of the first works of Arnold. Breguet's homage to the revered memory of Arnold, given to his son AD 1808."

This important and significant watch is now in the British Museum's collection of clocks and watches. By the time of Arnold's death in 1799, he was the most famous watchmaker in the world, recognized for his pre-eminence as the inventor of the precision chronometer.

Birth Of John Arnold

1736 july 13

== See also ==
- Larcum Kendall
- Thomas Earnshaw
