= John Harrison =

English clockmaker (1693–1776)

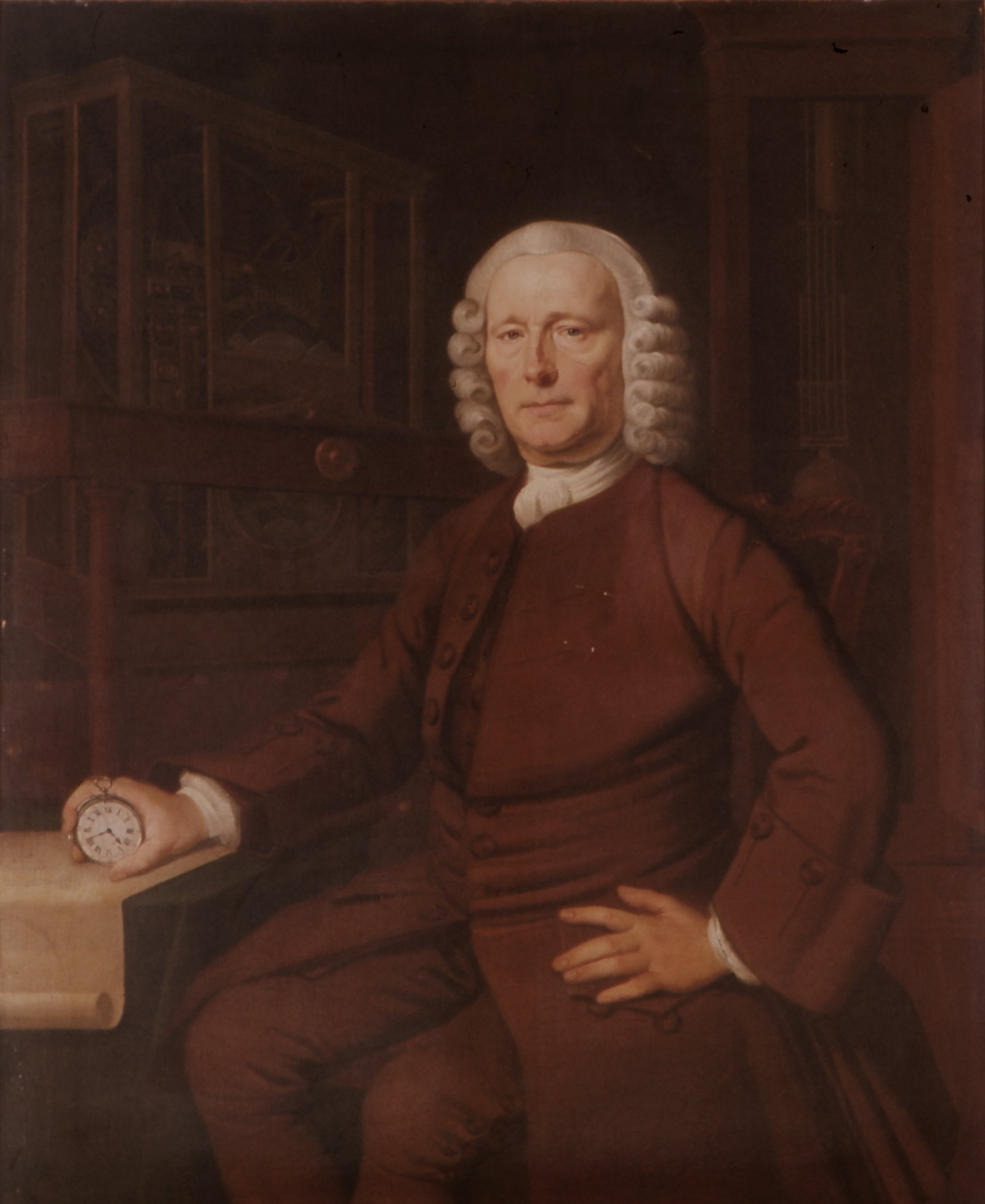
- Portrait by Thomas King, 1767
- Born: 3 April 1693 [O.S. 24 March 1692] Foulby, Wakefield, West Riding of Yorkshire in England
- Died: 24 March 1776 (aged 82); London, England
- Known for: Bimetallic strip Gridiron pendulum Grasshopper escapement Longitude by chronometer Marine chronometer
- Awards: Copley Medal (1749); Longitude rewards (1737 & 1773)
- Scientific career
- Fields: Horology & carpentry

John Harrison (3 April 1693 [O.S. 24 March 1692] – 24 March 1776) was an English joiner and clockmaker who invented the marine chronometer, a long-sought device for solving the problem of how to calculate longitude while at sea.

Harrison's solution revolutionized navigation and greatly increased the safety of long-distance sea travel. The problem he solved had been considered so important following the Scilly naval disaster of 1707 that the British Parliament was offering financial rewards of up to £20,000 (equivalent to £3.83 million in 2025) under the 1714 Longitude Act, though Harrison never received the full reward due to political rivalries. He presented his first design in 1730, and worked over many years on improved designs, making several advances in time-keeping technology, finally turning to what were called sea watches. Harrison gained support from the Longitude Board in building and testing his designs. Towards the end of his life, he received recognition and a reward from Parliament.

== Early life ==
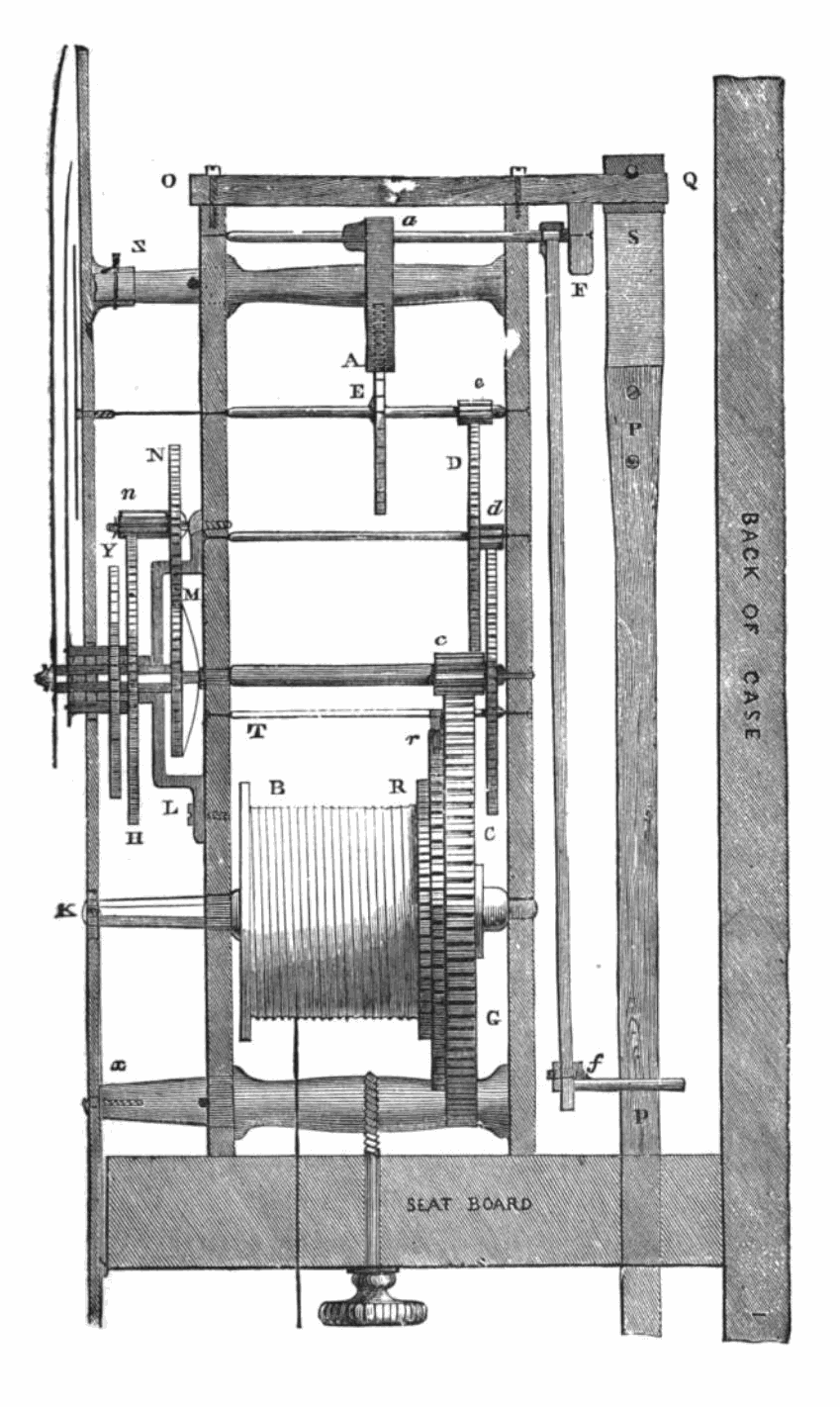
Woodcut of cross section of English longcase (grandfather) clock movement from the mid-1800s

John Harrison was born in Foulby in the West Riding of Yorkshire, the first of five children in his family. His stepfather worked as a carpenter at the nearby Nostell Priory estate. A house on the site of what may have been the family home bears a blue plaque. Around 1700, the Harrison family moved to the Lincolnshire village of Barrow upon Humber. Following his father's trade as a carpenter, Harrison built and repaired clocks in his spare time. Legend has it that at the age of six, while in bed with smallpox, he was given a watch to amuse himself and he spent hours listening to it and studying its moving parts.. This, however, is probably false: at the time, watches were expensive, and no clockmaker is known to have lived or worked near north Lincolnshire.

He also had a fascination with music, eventually becoming choirmaster for the Church of Holy Trinity, Barrow upon Humber.

Harrison built his first longcase clock in 1713, at the age of 20. The mechanism was made entirely of wood. Three of Harrison's early wooden clocks have survived:

- The first (1713) is in the Worshipful Company of Clockmakers' collection, previously in the Guildhall in London and since 2015 on display in the Science Museum.
- The second (1715) is also in the Science Museum in London.
- The third (1717) is at Nostell Priory in Yorkshire, the face bearing the inscription "John Harrison Barrow".

The Nostell example, in the billiards room of the stately home, has a Victorian outer case with small glass windows on each side of the movement so that the wooden workings may be inspected.

On 30 August 1718, John Harrison married Elizabeth Barret at Barrow upon Humber church. After her death in 1726, he married Elizabeth Scott on 23 November 1726, at the same church.

In the early 1720s, Harrison was commissioned to make a new turret clock at Brocklesby Hall, North Lincolnshire. The clock still works, and like his previous clocks has a wooden movement of oak and lignum vitae. Unlike his early clocks, it incorporates some original features to improve timekeeping, for example, the grasshopper escapement. Between 1725 and 1728, John and his brother James, also a skilled joiner, made at least three precision longcase clocks, again with the movements and longcase made of oak and lignum vitae. The grid-iron pendulum was developed during this period. Of these longcase clocks:

- Number 1 is in a private collection. Until 2004, it belonged to the Time Museum (USA), which closed in 2000.
- Number 2 is in the Leeds City Museum, as the centrepiece of a permanent display dedicated to John Harrison's achievements. The exhibition, "John Harrison: The Clockmaker Who Changed the World", opened on 23 January 2014. It was the first longitude-related event marking the tercentenary of the Longitude Act.
- Number 3 is in the collection of the Worshipful Company of Clockmakers.

Harrison was a man of many skills and he used these to systematically improve the performance of the pendulum clock. He invented the gridiron pendulum, consisting of alternating brass and iron rods assembled in such a way that the thermal expansions and contractions essentially cancel each other out. Another example of his inventive genius was the grasshopper escapement, a control device for the step-by-step release of a clock's driving power. Developed from the anchor escapement, it was almost frictionless, requiring no lubrication because the pallets were made from wood. This was an important advantage at a time when lubricants and their degradation were little understood. In his earlier work on sea clocks, Harrison was continually assisted, both financially and in many other ways, by the watchmaker and instrument maker George Graham. Harrison was introduced to Graham by the Astronomer Royal Edmond Halley, who championed Harrison and his work. The support was important to Harrison, as he was supposed to have found it difficult to communicate his ideas in a coherent manner.

== Longitude problem ==
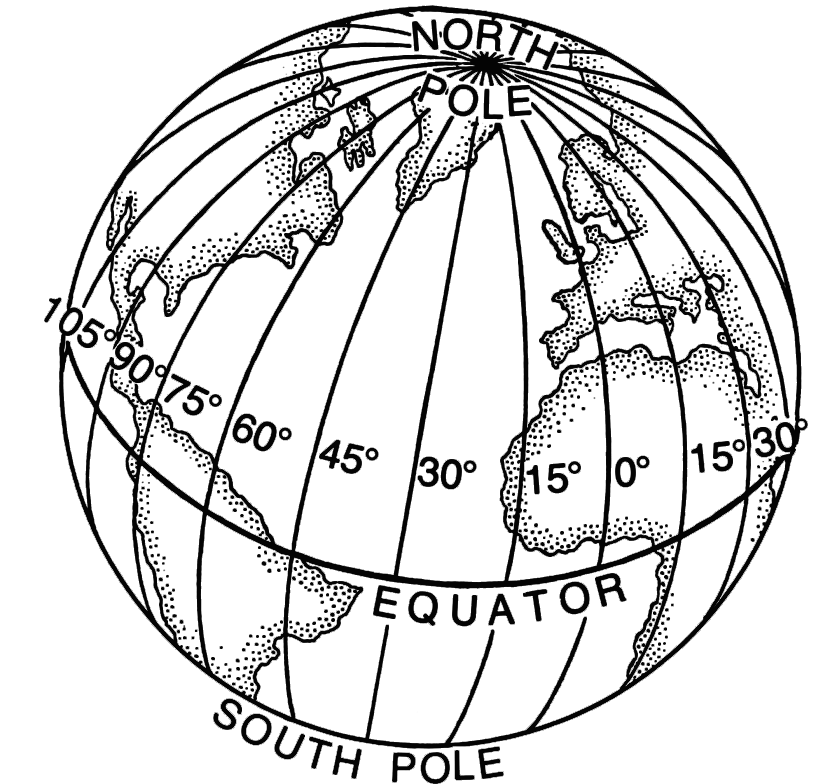
Longitude lines on the globe

Longitude fixes the location of a place on Earth east or west of a north–south reference line called the prime meridian. It is given as an angular measurement that ranges from 0° at the prime meridian to +180° eastward and −180° westward. Knowledge of a ship's east–west position is essential when approaching land. Over long voyages, cumulative errors in estimates of position by dead reckoning frequently led to shipwrecks and a great loss of life. Avoiding such disasters became vital in Harrison's lifetime, in an era when trade and the need for accurate navigation were increasing dramatically around the world.

Many ideas were proposed for how to determine longitude during a sea voyage. Earlier methods attempted to compare local time with the known time at a reference place, such as Greenwich or Paris, based on a simple theory that had first been proposed by Gemma Frisius. The methods relied on astronomical observations that were themselves reliant on the predictable nature of the motions of different heavenly bodies. Such methods were problematic because of the difficulty in maintaining an accurate record of the time at the reference place.

Harrison set out to solve the problem directly by producing a reliable clock that could keep the time of the reference place accurately over long intervals without having to constantly adjust it. The difficulty was in producing a clock that was not affected by variations in temperature, pressure, or humidity, resisted corrosion in salt air, and was able to function on board a constantly moving ship. Many scientists, including Sir Isaac Newton and Christiaan Huygens, doubted that such a clock could ever be built and favoured other methods for reckoning longitude, such as the method of lunar distances. Huygens ran trials using both a pendulum and a spiral balance spring clock as methods of determining longitude; both produced inconsistent results. Newton observed that "a good watch may serve to keep a reckoning at sea for some days and to know the time of a celestial observation; and for this end a good Jewel may suffice till a better sort of watch can be found out. But when longitude at sea is lost, it cannot be found again by any watch".

== First three marine timekeepers ==
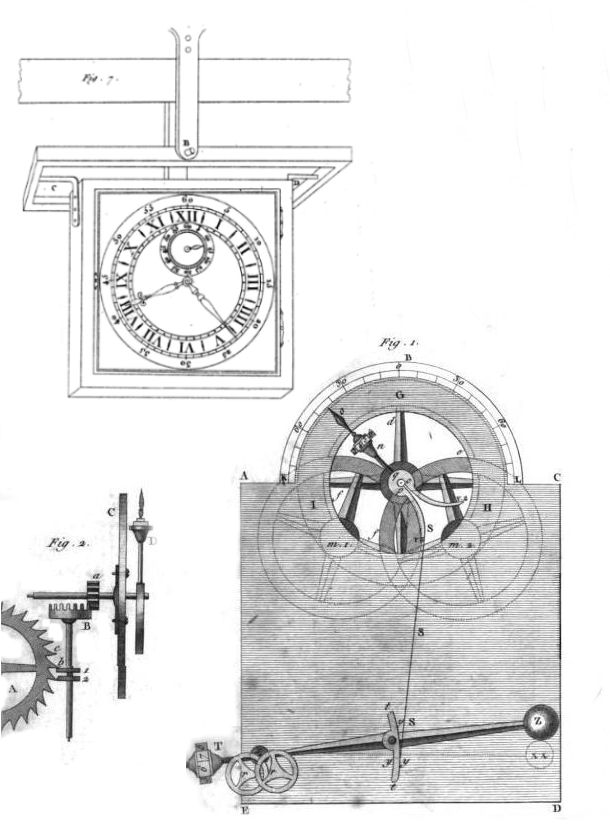
Henry Sully's clock (Fig.1) with escapement (Fig.2) and shipboard gimbaled suspension mechanism (Fig.7)

In the 1720s, the English clockmaker Henry Sully invented a marine clock that was designed to determine longitude: this was in the form of a clock with a large balance wheel that was vertically mounted on friction rollers and impulsed by a frictional rest Debaufre-type escapement. Very unconventionally, the balance oscillations were controlled by a weight at the end of a pivoted horizontal lever attached to the balance by a cord. This solution avoided temperature error due to thermal expansion, a problem which affects steel balance springs. Sully's clock kept accurate time only in calm weather, however, because the balance oscillations were affected by the pitching and rolling of the ship. Still, his clocks were among the first serious attempts to find longitude by improving the accuracy of timekeeping at sea. Harrison's machines, though much larger, are of similar layout: H3 has a vertically mounted balance wheel and is linked to another wheel of the same size, an arrangement that eliminates problems arising from the ship's motion.

In 1716 Sully presented his first Montre de la Mer to the French Académie des Sciences and in 1726 he published Une Horloge inventée et executée par M. Sulli. In 1730 Harrison designed a marine clock to compete for the Longitude prize and travelled to London, seeking financial assistance. He presented his ideas to Edmond Halley, the Astronomer Royal, who in turn referred him to George Graham, the country's foremost clockmaker. Graham must have been impressed by Harrison's ideas, for he loaned him money to build a model of his "Sea clock". As the clock was an attempt to make a seagoing version of his wooden pendulum clocks, which performed exceptionally well, he used wooden wheels, roller pinions, and a version of the grasshopper escapement. Instead of a pendulum, he used two dumbbell balances which were linked together.

It took Harrison five years to build his first sea clock (or H1). He demonstrated it to members of the Royal Society who spoke on his behalf to the Board of Longitude. The clock was the first proposal that the Board considered to be worthy of a sea trial. In 1736, Harrison sailed to Lisbon on HMS Centurion under the command of Captain George Proctor and returned on HMS Orford after Proctor died at Lisbon on 4 October 1736. The clock lost time on the outward voyage. However, it performed well on the return trip: both the captain and the sailing master of the Orford praised the design. The master noted that his own calculations had placed the ship sixty miles east of its true landfall which had been correctly predicted by Harrison using H1.

This was not the transatlantic voyage stipulated by the Board of Longitude in their conditions for winning the prize, but the Board was impressed enough to grant Harrison £500 for further development. Harrison had moved to London by 1737 and went on to develop H2, a more compact and rugged version. In 1741, after three years of building and two of on-land testing, H2 was ready, but by then Britain was at war with Spain in the War of the Austrian Succession, and the mechanism was deemed too important to risk falling into Spanish hands. In any event, Harrison suddenly abandoned all work on this second machine when he discovered a serious design flaw in the concept of the bar balances. He had not recognized that the period of oscillation of the bar balances could be affected by the yawing action of the ship (when the ship turned upon its vertical axis, such as when "coming about" while tacking). It was this that led him to adopt circular balances in the Third Sea Clock (H3). The Board granted him another £500 and while waiting for the war to end, he proceeded to work on H3.

Harrison spent seventeen years working on this third "sea clock", but despite every effort it did not perform exactly as he had wished. The problem was that, because Harrison did not fully understand the physics behind the springs used to control the balance wheels, the timing of the wheels was not isochronous, a characteristic that affected its accuracy. The engineering world was not to fully understand the properties of springs for such applications for another two centuries. Despite that, it had proved a very valuable experiment and much was learned from its construction. Certainly with this machine Harrison left the world two enduring legacies–the bimetallic strip and the caged roller bearing.

Harrison's first three marine timekeepers
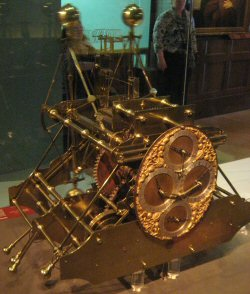
Harrison's first sea clock, the H1

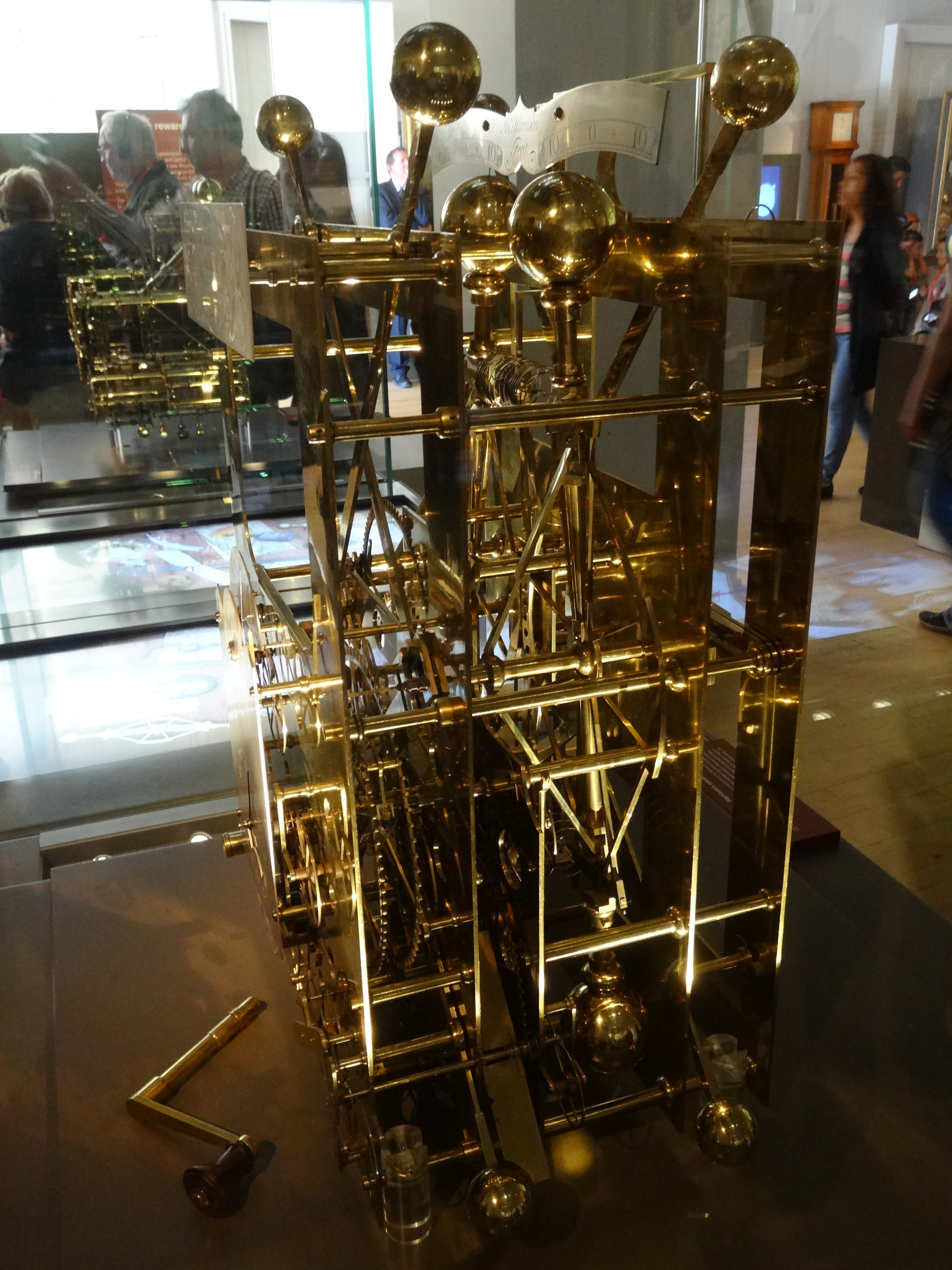
Harrison's second sea clock, the H2

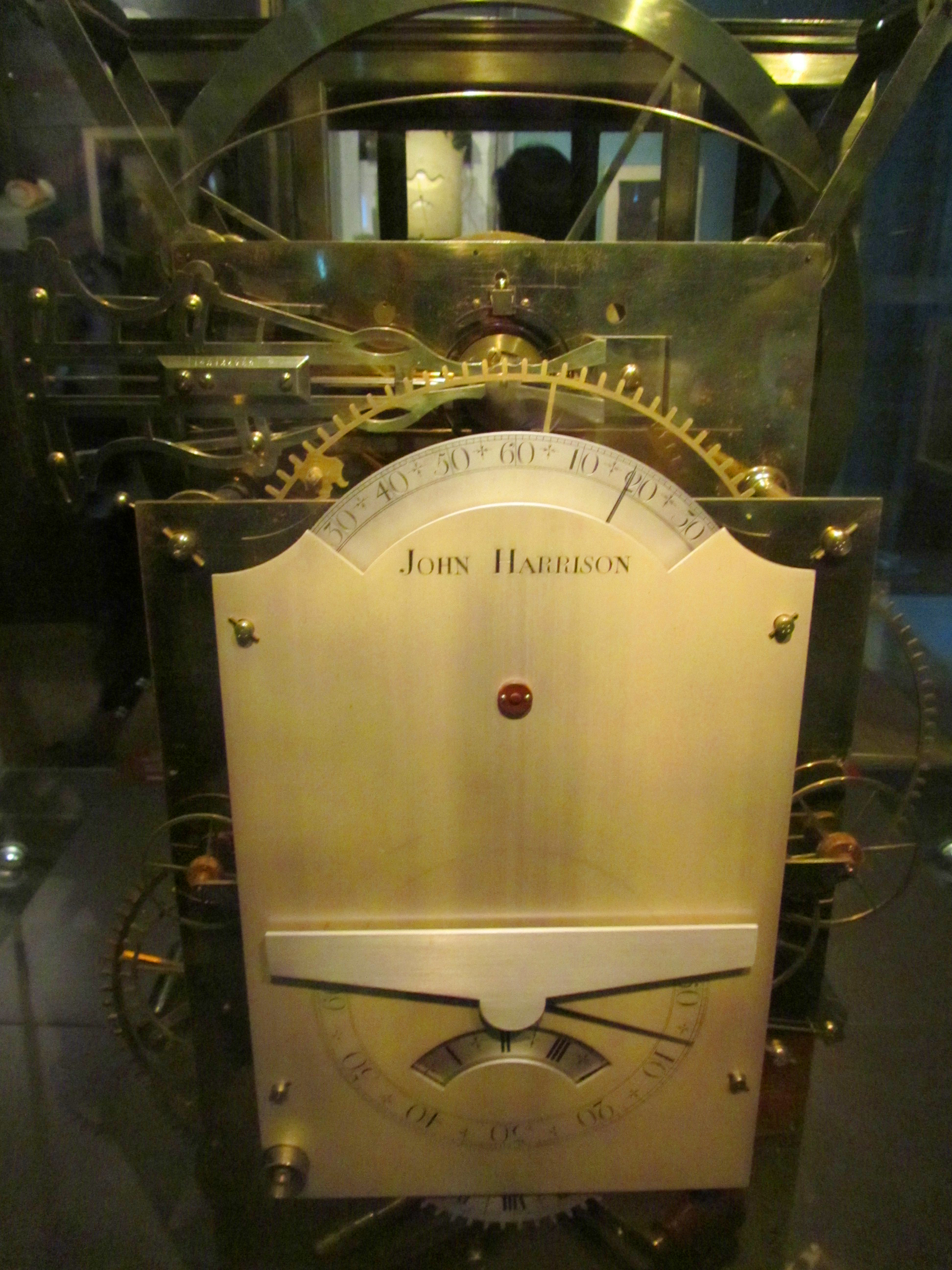
Harrison's third sea clock, the H3

== Longitude watches ==
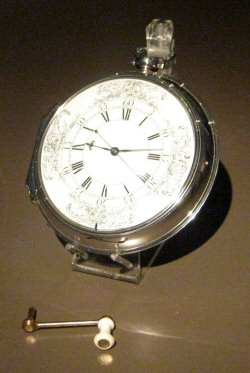
Harrison's "sea watch" No. 1 (H4), with winding crank

After steadfastly pursuing various methods during thirty years of experimentation, Harrison found to his surprise that some of the watches made by Graham's successor Thomas Mudge kept time just as accurately as his huge sea clocks. It is possible that Mudge was able to do this after the early 1740s thanks to the availability of the new "Huntsman" or "Crucible" steel first produced by Benjamin Huntsman sometime in the early 1740s, which enabled harder pinions but more importantly a tougher and more highly polished cylinder escapement to be produced. Harrison then realized that a mere watch after all could be made accurate enough for the task and was a far more practical proposition for use as a marine timekeeper. He proceeded to redesign the concept of the watch as a timekeeping device, basing his design on sound scientific principles.

=== "Jefferys" watch ===
He had already in the early 1750s designed a precision watch for his own use, which was made for him by the watchmaker John Jefferys c. 1752–1753. This watch incorporated a novel frictional rest escapement and was not only the first to have a compensation for temperature variations but also contained the first miniature going train fusee of Harrison's design which enabled the watch to continue running whilst being wound. These features led to the very successful performance of the "Jefferys" watch, which Harrison incorporated into the design of two new timekeepers which he proposed to build. These were in the form of a large watch and another of a smaller size but similar pattern. However, only the larger No. 1 watch (or "H4" as it is sometimes called) appears to have been finished (see the reference to "H4" below). Aided by some of London's finest workmen, he proceeded to design and make the world's first successful marine timekeeper that allowed a navigator to accurately assess his ship's position in longitude. Importantly, Harrison showed everyone that it could be done by using a watch to calculate longitude. This was to be Harrison's masterpiece – an instrument of beauty, resembling an oversized pocket watch from the period. It is engraved with Harrison's signature, marked Number 1 and dated AD 1759.

=== H4 ===
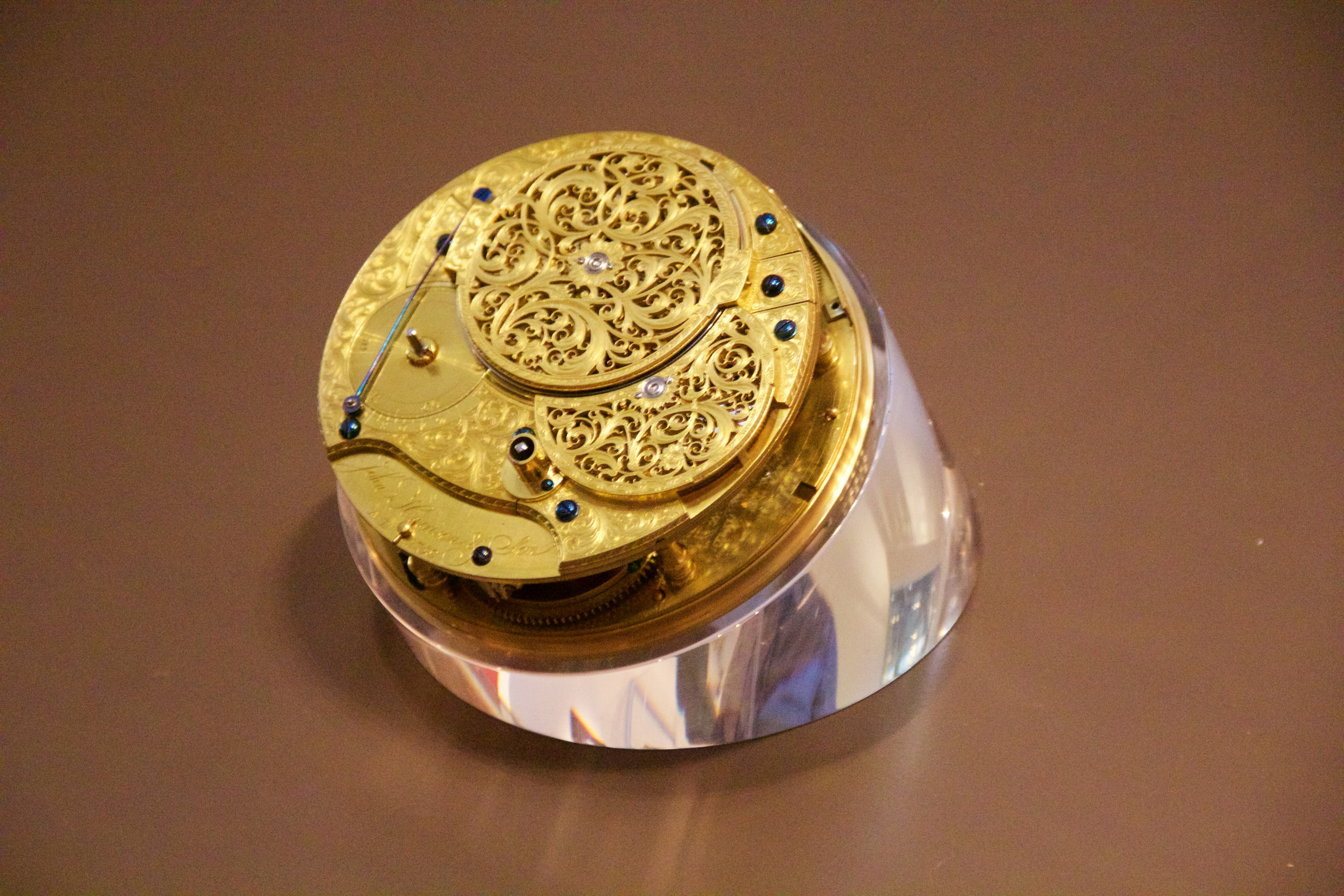
The clockwork in Harrison's H4 watch

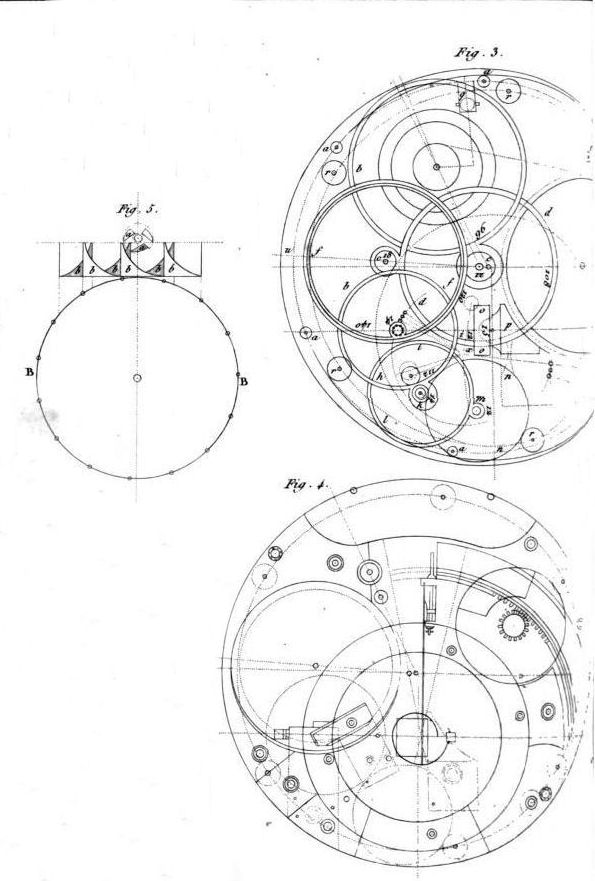
Drawings of Harrison's H4 chronometer of 1761, published in The principles of Mr Harrison's time-keeper, 1767.

Harrison's first "sea watch" (now known as H4) is housed in silver pair cases some 5.2 inches (13 cm) in diameter. The clock's movement is highly complex for the period, resembling a larger version of the then-current conventional movement. A coiled steel spring inside a brass mainspring barrel provides 30 hours of power. That is covered by the fusee barrel which pulls a chain wrapped around the conically shaped pulley known as the fusee. The fusee is topped by the winding square (requiring a separate key). The great wheel attached to the base of this fusee transmits power to the rest of the movement. The fusee contains the maintaining power, a mechanism for keeping the H4 going while being wound. From Gould:

The escapement is a modification of the "verge" fitted to... the common watches of Harrison's day. But the modifications are extensive. The pallets are very small, and have their faces set parallel, instead of at the usual angle of 95° or so. Moreover, instead of being steel, they are of diamond, and their backs are shaped to cycloidal curves... The action of this escapement is quite different from that of the verge, which it appears to resemble. In that escapement, the teeth of the crown wheel act only upon the faces of the pallets. But in this, as will be seen from the points of the teeth rest, for a considerable portion of the supplementary arc—from 90° to 145° (limit of banking) past the dead point—upon the backs of the pallets, and tend to assist the balance towards the extreme of its swing and to retard its return. This escapement is obviously a great improvement upon the verge, as the train has far less power over the motions of the balance. The latter is no longer checked in its swing by a force equal to that which originally impelled it, but by the balance spring, assisted only by the friction between the tooth and the back of the pallet.

In comparison, the verge's escapement has a recoil with a limited balance arc and is sensitive to variations in driving torque. According to a review by H. M. Frodsham of the movement in 1878, H4's escapement had "a good deal of 'set' and not so much recoil, and as a result the impulse came very near to a double chronometer action".

The D-shaped pallets of Harrison's escapement are both made of diamond, approximately 2 mm long with the curved side radius of 0.6 mm, a considerable feat of manufacture at the time. For technical reasons the balance was made much larger than in a conventional watch of the period, 2.2 inches (56 mm) in diameter weighing 28 5/8 Troy grains (1.85 g) and the vibrations controlled by a flat spiral steel spring of three turns with a long straight tail. The spring is tapered, being thicker at the stud end and tapering toward the collet at the centre. The movement also has centre seconds motion with a sweep seconds hand.

The Third Wheel is equipped with internal teeth and has an elaborate bridge similar to the pierced and engraved bridge for the period. It runs at 5 beats (ticks) per second, and is equipped with a tiny 7 1/2 second remontoire. A balance-brake, activated by the position of the fusee, stops the watch half an hour before it is completely run down, in order that the remontoire does not run down also. Temperature compensation is in the form of a 'compensation curb' (or 'Thermometer Kirb' as Harrison called it). This takes the form of a bimetallic strip mounted on the regulating slide, and carrying the curb pins at the free end. During its initial testing, Harrison dispensed with this regulation using the slide, but left its indicating dial or figure piece in place. This first watch took six years to construct, following which the Board of Longitude determined to trial it on a voyage from Portsmouth to Kingston in the Colony of Jamaica. For this purpose it was placed aboard the 50-gun HMS Deptford, which set sail from Portsmouth on 18 November 1761. Harrison, by then 68 years old, sent it on this transatlantic trial in the care of his son, William. The watch was tested before departure by Robertson, Master of the Academy at Portsmouth, who reported that on 6 November 1761 at noon it was 3 seconds slow, having lost 24 seconds in 9 days on mean solar time. The daily rate of the watch was therefore fixed as losing 24/9 seconds per day.

When Deptford reached its destination, after correction for the initial error of 3 seconds and accumulated loss of 3 minutes 36.5 seconds at the daily rate over the 81 days and 5 hours of the voyage, the watch was found to be 5 seconds slow compared to the known longitude of Kingston, corresponding to an error in longitude of 1.25 minutes, or approximately one nautical mile. William Harrison returned aboard the 14-gun HMS Merlin, reaching England on 26 March 1762 to report the successful outcome of the experiment. Harrison senior thereupon waited for the £20,000 prize, but the Board were persuaded that the accuracy could have been just luck and demanded another trial. The Board were also not convinced that a timekeeper which took six years to construct met the test of practicality required by the Longitude Act. The Harrisons were outraged and demanded their prize, a matter that eventually worked its way to Parliament, which offered £5,000 for the design. The Harrisons refused but were eventually obliged to make another trip to Bridgetown on the island of Barbados to settle the matter.

At the time of this second trial, another method for measuring longitude was ready for testing: the Method of Lunar Distances. The Moon moves fast enough, some thirteen degrees a day, to easily measure the movement from day to day. By comparing the angle between the Moon and the Sun for the day one left for Britain, the "proper position" (how it would appear in Greenwich, England, at that specific time) of the Moon could be calculated. By comparing this with the angle of the Moon over the horizon, the longitude could be calculated. During Harrison's second trial of his 'sea watch' (H4), Nevil Maskelyne was asked to accompany HMS Tartar and test the Lunar Distances system. Once again the watch proved extremely accurate, keeping time to within 39 seconds, corresponding to an error in the longitude of Bridgetown of less than 10 miles (16 km). Maskelyne's measures were also fairly good, at 30 miles (48 km), but required considerable work and calculation in order to use. At a meeting of the Board in 1765 the results were presented, but they again attributed the accuracy of the measurements to luck. Once again the matter reached Parliament, which offered £10,000 in advance and the other half once he turned over the design to other watchmakers to duplicate. In the meantime Harrison's watch would have to be turned over to the Astronomer Royal for long-term on-land testing.

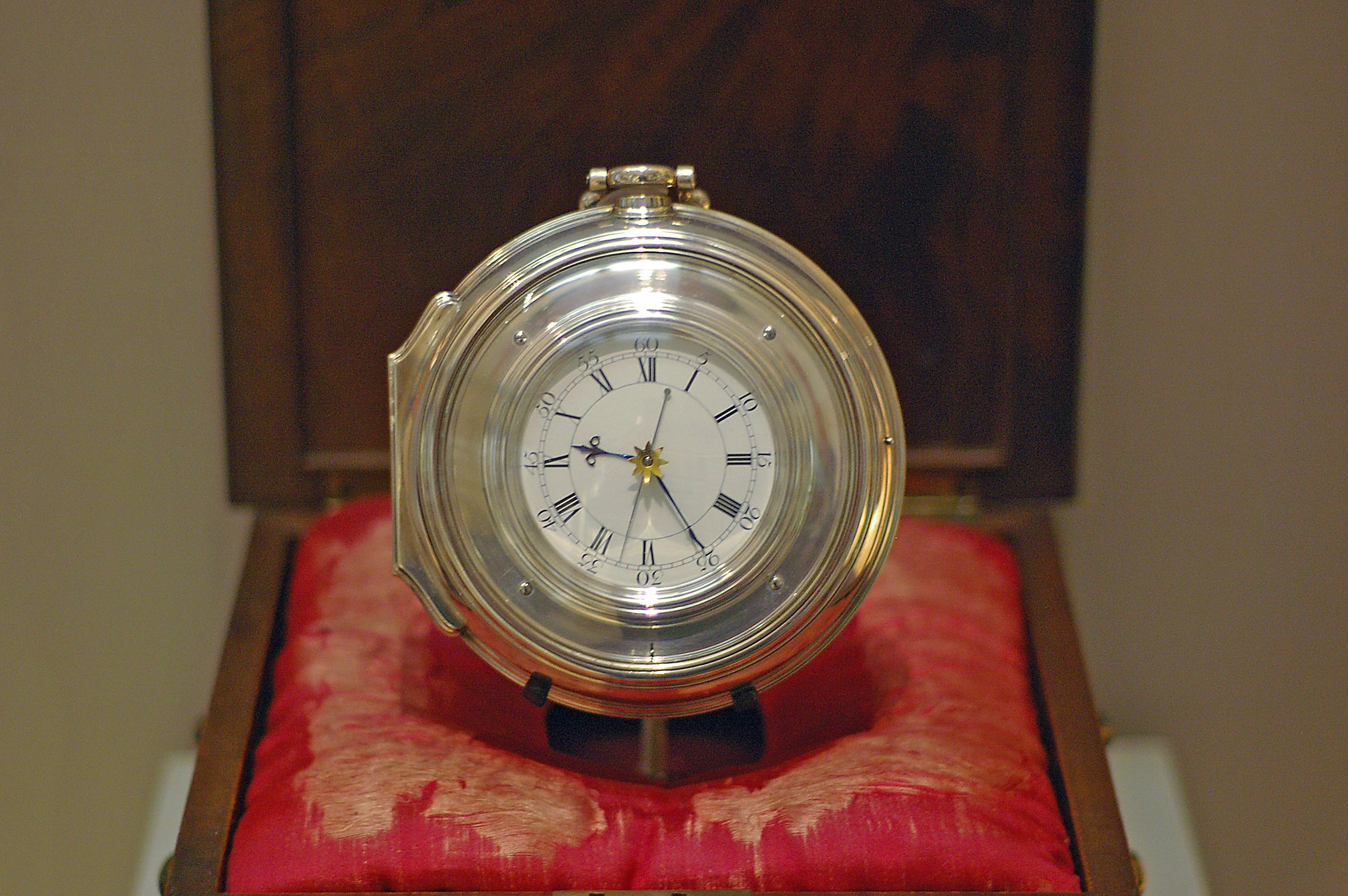
Harrison's Chronometer H5, (Collection of the Worshipful Company of Clockmakers), in the Science Museum, London

Unfortunately, Nevil Maskelyne had been appointed Astronomer Royal on his return from Barbados, and was therefore also placed on the Board of Longitude. He returned a report of the watch that was negative, claiming that its "going rate" (the amount of time it gained or lost per day) was due to inaccuracies cancelling themselves out, and refused to allow it to be factored out when measuring longitude. Consequently, this first Marine Watch of Harrison's failed the needs of the Board despite the fact that it had succeeded in two previous trials. Harrison began working on his second 'sea watch' (H5) while testing was conducted on the first, which Harrison felt was being held hostage by the Board. After three years he had had enough; Harrison felt "extremely ill used by the gentlemen who I might have expected better treatment from" and decided to enlist the aid of King George III. He obtained an audience with the King, who was extremely annoyed with the Board. King George tested the watch No. 2 (H5) himself at the palace and after ten weeks of daily observations between May and July in 1772, found it to be accurate to within one third of one second per day. King George then advised Harrison to petition Parliament for the full prize after threatening to appear in person to dress them down. Finally in 1773, when he was 80 years old, Harrison received a monetary award in the amount of £8,750 from Parliament for his achievements, but he never received the official award (which was never awarded to anyone). He was to live for just three more years.

In total, Harrison received £23,065 for his work on chronometers. He received £4,315 in increments from the Board of Longitude for his work, £10,000 as an interim payment for H4 in 1765 and £8,750 from Parliament in 1773. This gave him a reasonable income for most of his life (equivalent to roughly £450,000 per year in 2007, though all his costs, such as materials and subcontracting work to other horologists, had to come out of this). He became the equivalent of a multi-millionaire (in today's terms) in the final decade of his life. Captain James Cook used K1, a copy of H4, on his second and third voyages, having used the lunar distance method on his first voyage. K1 was made by Larcum Kendall, who had been apprenticed to John Jefferys. Cook's log is full of praise for the watch and the charts of the southern Pacific Ocean he made with its use were remarkably accurate. K2 was loaned to Lieutenant William Bligh, commander of HMS Bounty, but it was retained by Fletcher Christian following the infamous mutiny. It was not recovered from Pitcairn Island until 1808, when it was given to Captain Mayhew Folger, and then passed through several hands before reaching the National Maritime Museum in London.

Initially, the cost of these chronometers was quite high (roughly 30% of a ship's cost). However, over time, the costs dropped to between £25 and £100 (half a year's to two years' salary for a skilled worker) in the early 19th century. Many historians point to relatively low production volumes over time as evidence that the chronometers were not widely used. However, Landes points out that the chronometers lasted for decades and did not need to be replaced frequently–indeed the number of makers of marine chronometers reduced over time due to the ease in supplying the demand even as the merchant marine expanded. Also, many merchant mariners would make do with a deck chronometer at half the price. These were not as accurate as the boxed marine chronometer but were adequate for many. While the Lunar Distances method would complement and rival the marine chronometer initially, the chronometer would overtake it in the 19th century. The more accurate Harrison timekeeping device led to the much-needed precise calculation of longitude, making the device a fundamental key to the modern age. After Harrison, the marine timekeeper was reinvented yet again by John Arnold, who, while basing his design on Harrison's most important principles, at the same time simplified it enough for him to produce equally accurate but far less costly marine chronometers in quantity from around 1783. Nonetheless, for many years even towards the end of the 18th century, chronometers were expensive rarities, as their adoption and use proceeded slowly due to the high expense of precision manufacturing. The expiry of Arnold's patents at the end of the 1790s enabled many other watchmakers including Thomas Earnshaw to produce chronometers in greater quantities at less cost even than those of Arnold.

By the early 19th century, navigation at sea without one was considered unwise to unthinkable. Using a chronometer to aid navigation simply saved lives and ships – the insurance industry, self-interest, and common sense did the rest in making the device a universal tool of maritime trade.

== Death and memorials ==
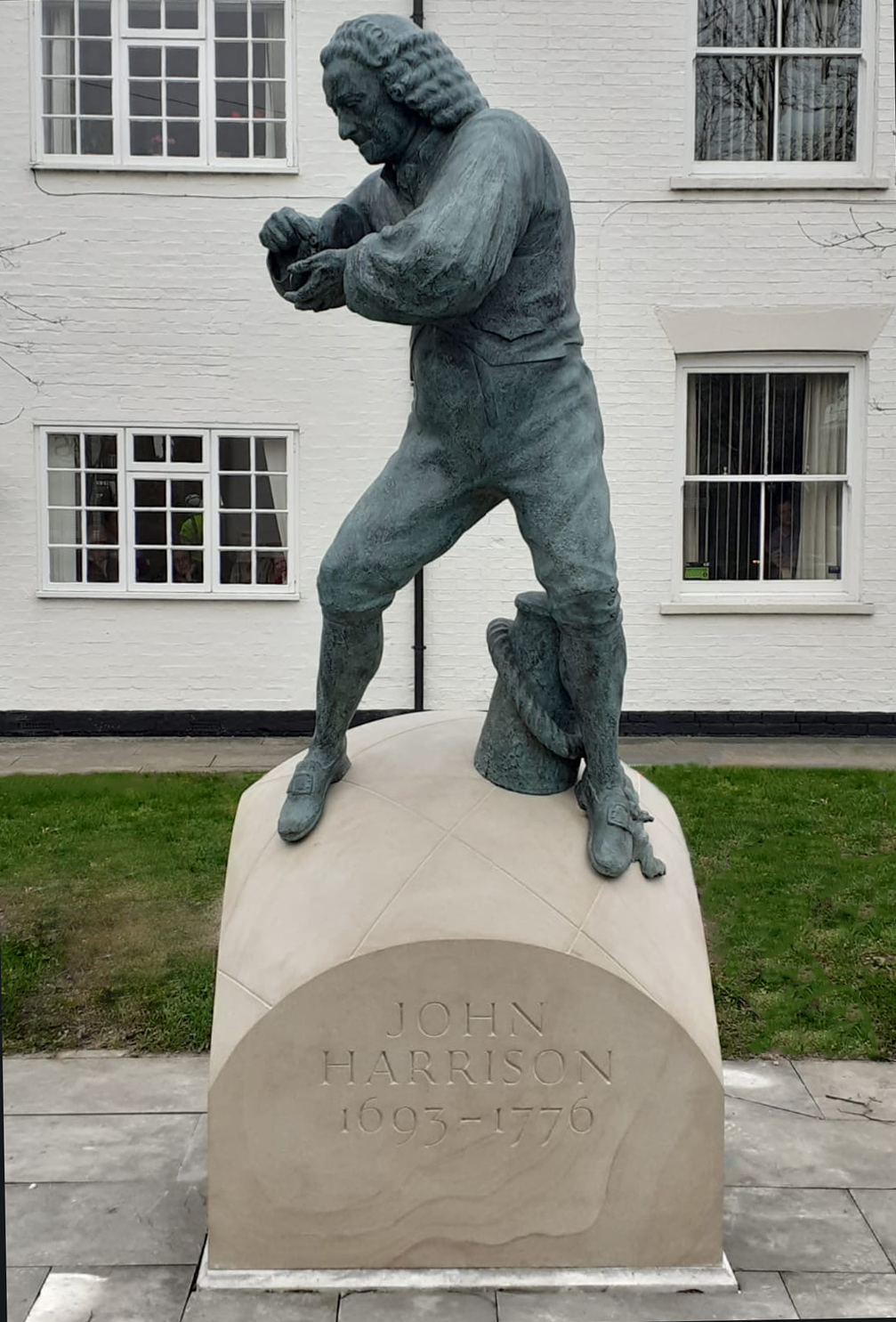
Bronze statue of John Harrison in Barrow upon Humber, Lincolnshire

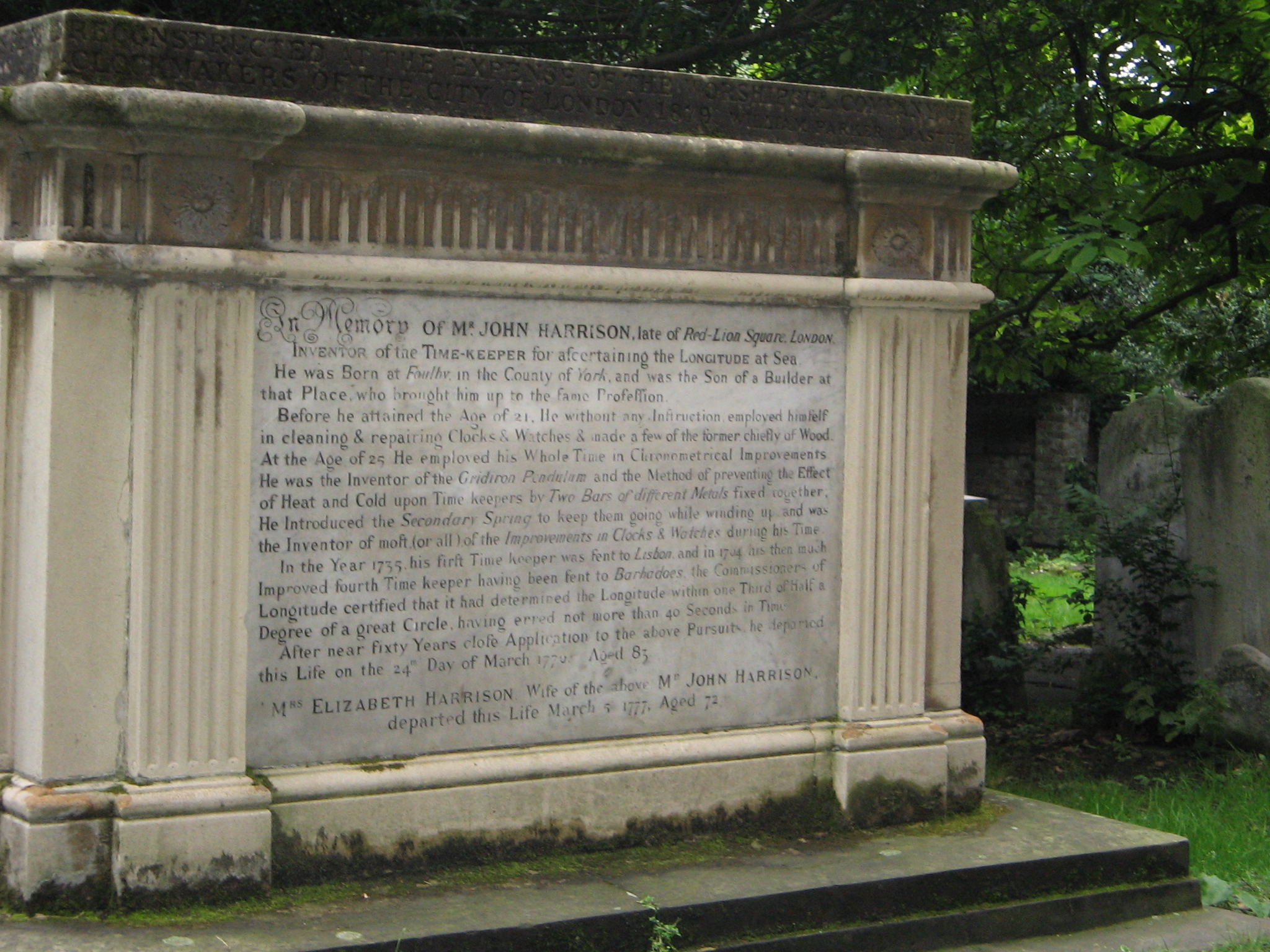
Harrison's tomb at St John-at-Hampstead

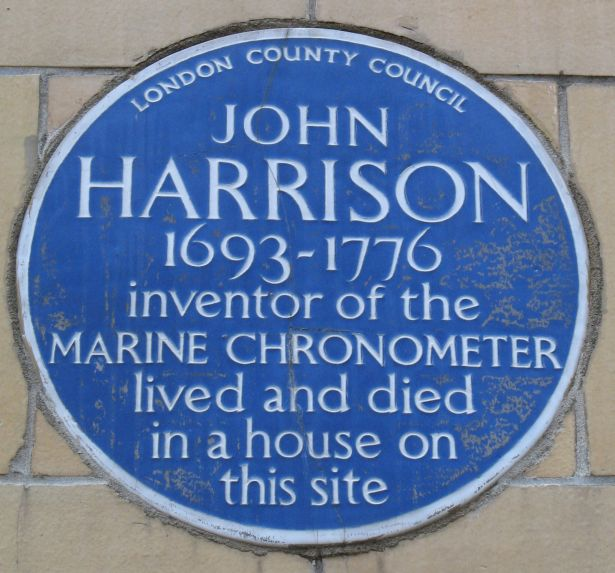
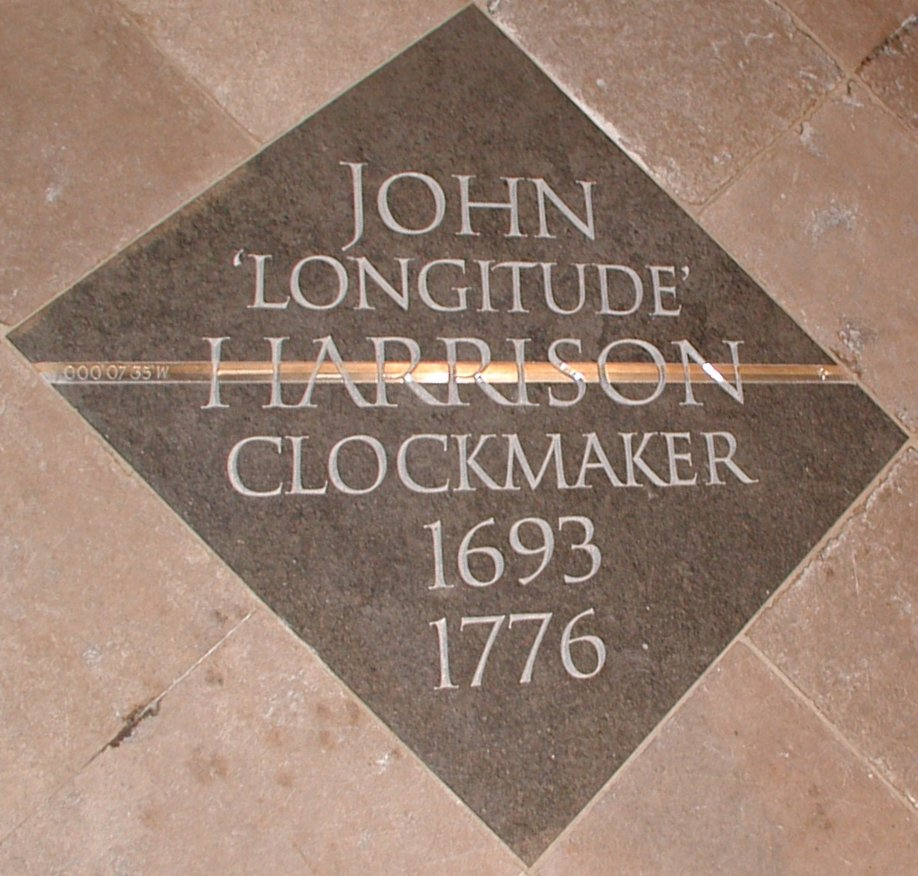
Memorials to Harrison; a blue plaque in Red Lion Square in London, and a modern memorial in Westminster Abbey

Harrison died on 24 March 1776, at the age of eighty-two, just shy of his eighty-third birthday. He was buried in the graveyard of St John's Church, Hampstead, in North London, along with his second wife Elizabeth and later their son William. His tomb was restored in 1879 by the Worshipful Company of Clockmakers, even though Harrison had never been a member of the Company.

Harrison's last home was 12 Red Lion Square in the Holborn district of London. There is a blue plaque dedicated to Harrison on the wall of Summit House, a 1925 modernist office block, on the south side of the square. A memorial tablet to Harrison was unveiled in Westminster Abbey on 24 March 2006, finally recognising him as a worthy companion to his friend George Graham and Thomas Tompion, 'The Father of English Watchmaking', who are both buried in the Abbey. The memorial shows a meridian line (line of constant longitude) in two metals to highlight Harrison's most widespread invention, the bimetallic strip thermometer. The strip is engraved with its own longitude of 0 degrees, 7 minutes and 35 seconds West.

The Corpus Clock in Cambridge, unveiled in 2008, is a homage by the designer to Harrison's work but is of an electromechanical design. In appearance it features Harrison's grasshopper escapement, the 'pallet frame' being sculpted to resemble an actual grasshopper. This is the clock's defining feature.

In 2014, Northern Rail named diesel railcar 153316 as the John 'Longitude' Harrison.

On 3 April 2018 Google celebrated his 325th birthday by making a Google Doodle for its homepage.

In February 2020 a bronze statue of Harrison, created by the sculptor Marcus Cornish, was unveiled in Barrow upon Humber.

== Later history ==
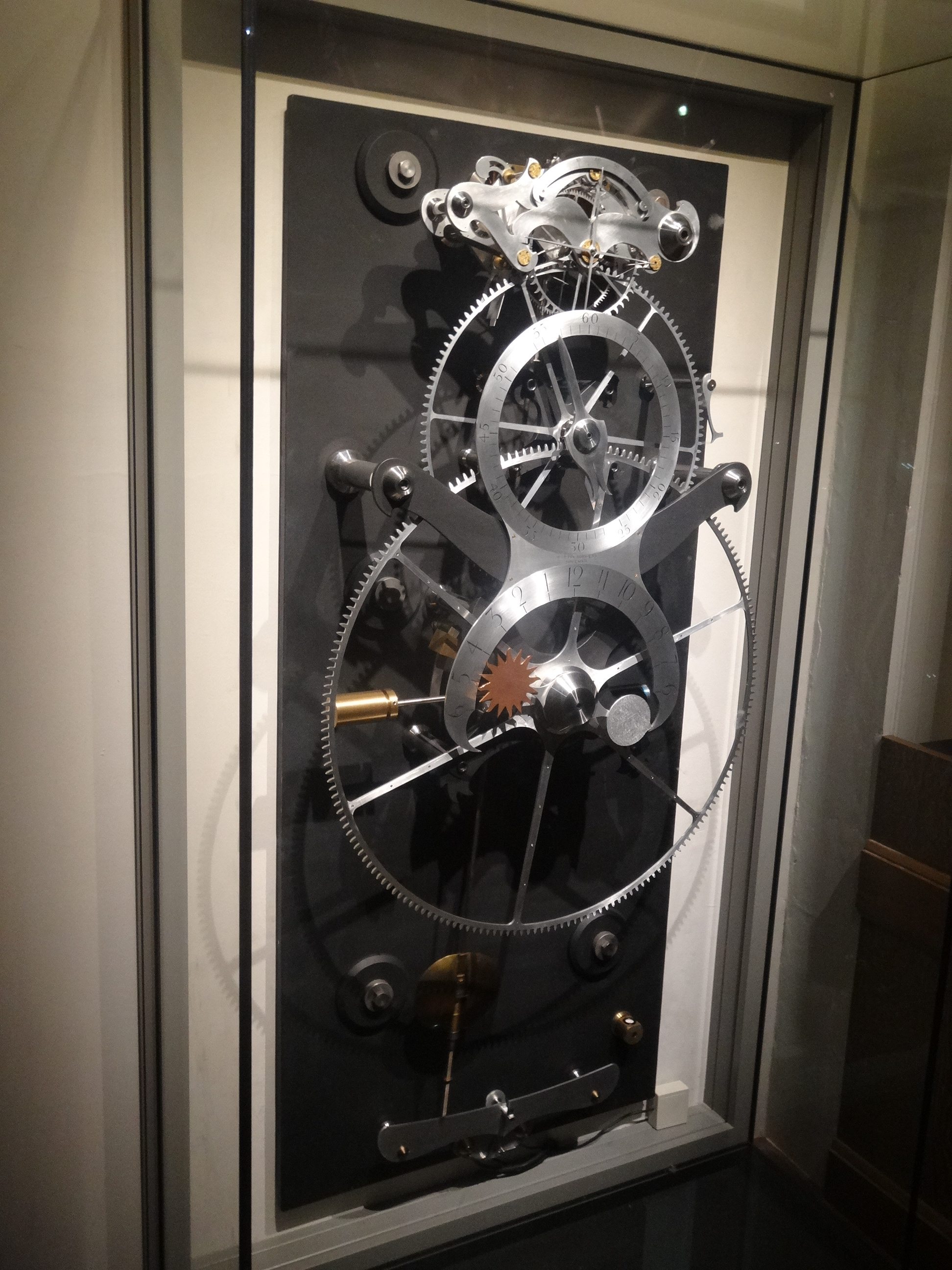
Clock B at the Royal Observatory, Greenwich

After the First World War, Harrison's timepieces were rediscovered at the Royal Greenwich Observatory by the retired naval officer Lieutenant Commander Rupert Gould.

The timepieces were in a highly decrepit state and Gould spent many years documenting, repairing and restoring them, without compensation for his efforts. Gould was the first to designate the timepieces from H1 to H5, initially calling them No.1 to No.5. Unfortunately, Gould made modifications and repairs that would not pass today's standards of good museum conservation practice, although most Harrison scholars give Gould credit for having ensured that the historical artifacts survived as working mechanisms to the present time. Gould wrote The Marine Chronometer, published in 1923, which covered the history of chronometers from the Middle Ages to the 1920s, and which included detailed descriptions of Harrison's work and the subsequent evolution of the chronometer. The book remains the authoritative work on the marine chronometer. Today the restored H1, H2, H3, and H4 timepieces can be seen on display in the Royal Observatory at Greenwich. H1, H2, and H3 still work: H4 is kept in a stopped state because, unlike the first three, it requires oil for lubrication and so will degrade as it runs. H5 is owned by the Worshipful Company of Clockmakers of London, and was previously on display at the Clockmakers' Museum in the Guildhall, London, as part of the Company's collection; since 2015 the collection has been displayed in the Science Museum, London.

In the final years of his life, Harrison wrote about his research into musical tuning and manufacturing methods for bells. His tuning system (a meantone system derived from pi), is described in his pamphlet A Description Concerning Such Mechanism ... (CSM). The system challenged the traditional view that harmonics occur at integer frequency ratios and in consequence all music using this tuning produces low-frequency beating. In 2002 Harrison's last manuscript, A true and short, but full Account of the Foundation of Musick, or, as principally therein, of the Existence of the Natural Notes of Melody, was rediscovered in the US Library of Congress. His theories on the mathematics of bell manufacturing (using "Radical Numbers") are yet to be clearly understood.

One of the controversial claims of his last years was that of being able to build a land clock more accurate than any competing design. Specifically, he claimed to have designed a clock capable of keeping accurate time to within one second over a span of 100 days. At the time, such publications as The London Review of English and Foreign Literature ridiculed Harrison for what was considered an outlandish claim. Harrison drew a design but never built such a clock himself, but in 1970 Martin Burgess, a Harrison expert and himself a clockmaker, studied the plans and endeavored to build the timepiece as drawn. He built two versions, dubbed Clock A and Clock B. Clock A became the Gurney Clock which was given to the city of Norwich in 1975, while Clock B lay unfinished in his workshop for decades until it was acquired in 2009 by Donald Saff. The completed Clock B was submitted to the National Maritime Museum in Greenwich for further study. It was found that Clock B could potentially meet Harrison's original claim, so the clock's design was carefully checked and adjusted. Finally, over a 100-day period from 6 January to 17 April 2015, Clock B was secured in a transparent case in the Royal Observatory and left to run untouched, apart from regular winding. Upon completion of the run, the clock was measured to have lost only 5/8 of a second, meaning Harrison's design was fundamentally sound. If we ignore the fact that this clock uses materials such as duraluminium and invar unavailable to Harrison, had it been built in 1762, the date of Harrison's testing of his H4, and run continuously since then without correction, it would now (October 2026) be slow by just 10 minutes and 4 seconds. Guinness World Records has declared Martin Burgess' Clock B the "most accurate mechanical clock with a pendulum swinging in free air."

== In literature, television, drama and music ==
External videos
- Booknotes interview with Dava Sobel on Longitude, January 17, 1999, C-SPAN
- Presentation by Sobel on Longitude, June 17, 1997, C-SPAN

In 1995 inspired by a Harvard University symposium on the longitude problem organized by the National Association of Watch and Clock Collectors, Dava Sobel wrote a book about Harrison's work. Longitude: The True Story of a Lone Genius Who Solved the Greatest Scientific Problem of His Time became the first popular bestseller on the subject of horology. The Illustrated Longitude, in which Sobel's text was accompanied by 180 images selected by William J. H. Andrewes, appeared in 1998. The book was dramatised for UK television by Charles Sturridge in a Granada Productions 4 episode series for Channel 4 in 1999, under the title Longitude. It was broadcast in the US later in the same year by the co-producer A&E. The production starred Michael Gambon as Harrison and Jeremy Irons as Gould. Sobel's book was the basis for a PBS NOVA episode entitled Lost at Sea: The Search for Longitude.

In 1998 the British composer Harrison Birtwistle wrote the piano piece "Harrison's clocks" which contains musical depictions of Harrison's various clocks. The composer Peter Graham's piece Harrison's Dream is about Harrison's forty-year quest to produce an accurate clock. Graham worked simultaneously on the brass band and wind band versions of the piece, which received their first performances just four months apart in October 2000 and February 2001 respectively.

The “Lesser Watch”, a fictional timepiece attributed to Harrison, plays a pivotal role in the 1996 Christmas Special of the UK sitcom Only Fools and Horses.

"John Harrison's Hands", a song about the man and his work, was written by Brian McNeill and Dick Gaughan, and has been recorded by both artists and by Show of Hands.

== Works ==
- Principes de la montre de Mr. Harrison. Avignon: veuve François Girard & François Seguin. 1767.

== See also ==
- History of longitude
- Lunar distance (navigation)
- Marine chronometer
- The Island of the Day Before – Umberto Eco
