= Board of Longitude =

British government department tasked with improving accurate marine chronometry

- Commissioners for the Discovery of the Longitude at Sea
- Formation: 1714
- Founder: Longitude Act 1714
- Dissolved: 1828
- Type: Government body
- Purpose: administration of a scheme of prizes intended to encourage innovators to solve the problem of finding longitude at sea
- Members: 24 (1714)

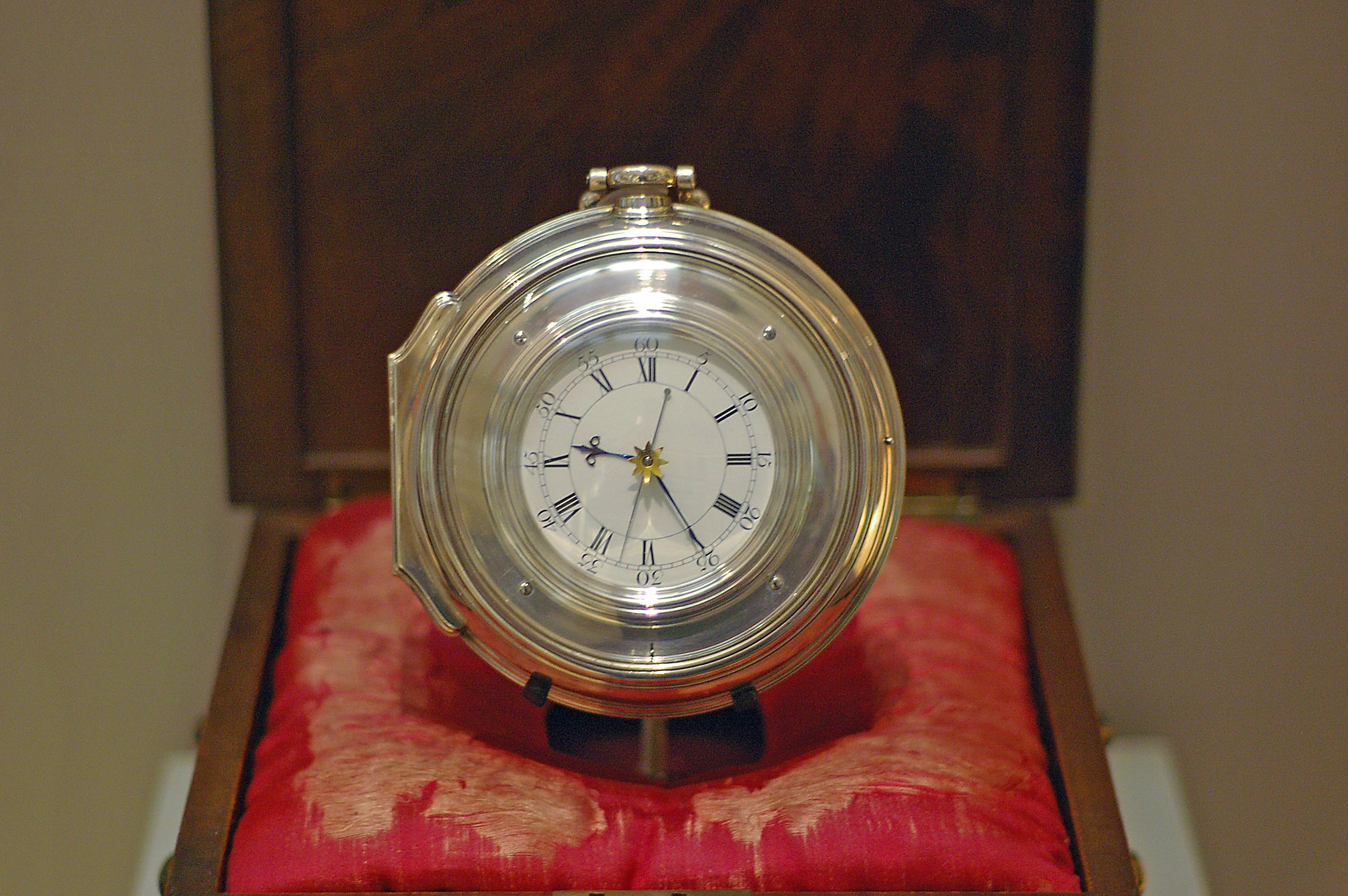
John Harrison's famous chronometer

The Commissioners for the Discovery of the Longitude at Sea, or more popularly Board of Longitude, was a British government body formed in 1714 to administer a scheme of prizes intended to encourage innovators to solve the problem of finding longitude at sea.

== Origins ==
Navigators and scientists had been working on the problem of not knowing a ship's longitude. The establishment of the Board of Longitude was motivated by this problem and by the 1707 grounding of four ships of Vice-Admiral Sir Cloudesley Shovell's fleet off the Isles of Scilly, resulting in heavy loss of life. Established by Queen Anne the Longitude Act 1714 (13 Ann. c. 14) (Note: This is the citation in The Statutes of the Realm.) named 24 Commissioners of Longitude, key figures from politics, the Navy, astronomy and mathematics. However, the Board did not meet until at least 1737 when interest grew in John Harrison's marine timekeeper.

The Board administered prizes for those who could demonstrate a working device or method. The main longitude prizes were:

- £10,000 for a method that could determine longitude within 1 longitude degree, equivalent to 60 nautical miles (110 km; 69 mi) at the equator (about £1,700,000 as of 2025);
- £15,000 for a method that could determine longitude within 40 longitudinal minutes, equivalent to 40 nautical miles (74 km; 46 mi) at the equator (about £2,500,000 as of 2025)
- £20,000 for a method that could determine longitude within 30 longitudinal minutes, equivalent to 30 nautical miles (56 km; 35 mi) at the equator (about £3,400,000 as of 2025).

In addition, the Board had the discretion to make awards to persons who were making significant contributions to the effort or to provide financial support to those who were working towards a solution. The Board could also make advances of up to £2,000 for experimental work deemed promising. Under this heading, the Board made many lesser awards, including some awards in total £5,000 made to John Harrison before he received his main prize, an award of £3,000 to the widow of Tobias Mayer, whose lunar tables were the basis of the lunar data in the early decades of The Nautical Almanac, £300 to Leonhard Euler for his (assumed) contribution to the work of Mayer, £50 each to Richard Dunthorne and Israel Lyons for contributing methods to shorten the calculations connected with lunar distances, and awards made to the designers of improvements in chronometers.

Even though many tried their hand at winning the main prize, for decades none were able to come up with a practical solution to the problem. The Board recognised that any serious attempt would be based on the recognition that the earth rotates through 15° of longitude every hour. The comparison of local time between a reference place (e.g., Greenwich) and the local time of the place in question would determine the longitude of that place. Since local apparent time could be determined with some ease, the problem centred on finding a means of determining (or in the case of chronometers, keeping) the time of the reference place when one is far away from it.

For details of the efforts towards determining the longitude, see History of longitude.

== End of the board's mandate ==
For many decades a sufficiently accurate chronometer was prohibitively expensive. The lunar distance method was used by mariners either in conjunction with or instead of the marine chronometer. However, with the expectation that accurate clocks would eventually become commonplace, John Harrison showed that his method was the way of the future. However, the board never awarded the prize to Harrison, nor anyone else.

With the significant problems considered as solved, the Board of Longitude was abolished by Act of Parliament in 1828 and replaced by a Resident Committee for Scientific Advice for the Admiralty consisting of three scientific advisors: Thomas Young, Michael Faraday and Edward Sabine.

== See also ==
- Longitude (book)
