= Thomas Mercer Chronometers =

British chronometer company

- Company type: Corporation
- Founded: 1858
- Headquarters: Richmond upon Thames, Surrey
- Key people: Thomas Mercer, Founder
- Products: chronometers
- Website: www.thomasmercer.com

Thomas Mercer Chronometers is a British company specialising in the design and production of bespoke chronometers.

== History ==
The story begins with John Harrison, as documented in Dava Sobel's book Longitude and its British television adaptation. Until then, ships had been navigating with accuracy only as regards the ship’s north-south position, using the North Star and/or the Southern Cross. Determining the east-west position of a ship and its destination was vital to the Admiralty’s, (and the Government’s), plans for further expansion and empire. It was also necessary to avoid the massive losses in time, money and human life that inaccurate navigation and shipwreck caused.

Lack of solutions led to the government making an Act of Parliament in 1714 offering a prize of £20,000 (£3M today). There was a whole spectrum of ideas suggested, ranging from serious (Whitton and Diston’s light-houses) to silly (using wounded dogs to yelp at set intervals). Isaac Newton was among the judges and concluded that a watch/clock would have to overcome the following challenge: a watch to keep time exactly: but by reason of the motion of the ship, the variation in heat and cold, wet and dry, and the difference in gravity at different latitudes, such a watch had not yet been made.

The competition winner was Harrison’s Sea Watch chronometer, in essence a super-accurate clock which functioned despite the rock and roll of the ship, and enabled a hitherto unimaginable level of navigational accuracy, driving Great Britain’s maritime empire to ever greater heights. Harrison received his official award only after repeated appeals and indeed the intervention of George III.

Harrison made only five chronometers (known as H1, H2, H3, H4 and H5), but his work was carried on by others, and (generally London-based) chronometer houses sprang up, great names like John Arnold, Edward John Dent, Thomas Earnshaw, Charles Frodsham, Hamilton, and Robert Molyneux. They refined his work: detent, chain and fusee, grasshopper escapement, and other developments informed their creations.

== Founding of the company ==
William Walker was born in 1783 and founded a dynasty of watchmakers in St. Helens, Merseyside. His grandson, Thomas Mercer (b. 1822) was apprenticed to him. Thomas’s father, Richard Mercer, was a sailmaker, so Thomas had the horological and the nautical in his career ancestry.

The Shackleton Chronometer.

Thomas moved to Liverpool to continue working as a watchmaker in 1843, and thence to London in 1854, to buy a one-way ticket to the USA, in search of new and better prospects. Seeing a chronometer in the window of John Fletcher (chronometer makers), he changed his mind about the USA, asking for work and being hired on the spot. He then founded the eponymous firm Thomas Mercer Chronometers in Islington, London in 1858. This area, (including Clerkenwell and Covent Garden), was a hotbed of creativity and retailing in the chronometer sector. It was highly competitive – as well as the British names of Dent, Frodsham, Reid, Blackie, Johnson.

The British Horological Institute (BHI) was established in Clerkenwell in 1858, supposedly the first professional horological institute ever. Mercer was its honorary treasurer from 1875 to 1895, and “lectured there on the need to modernize the industry and to train young people”. Years later, his grandson would have to be trained in France (see below) owing to lack of a college in the UK.

TMC (Thomas Mercer Chronometers) remained in Clerkenwell until it moved to bigger premises in St. Albans in 1874.

Chronometers were ‘rated’ for accuracy at the annual trials in Greenwich – success was often lucratively rewarded with contracts from private and public sectors. Tom came second at the Greenwich Trials in 1881. The following year, his son Frank Mercer was born, who in later years won Greenwich first prize in 1911 with Mercer 8306. It was bought by Astronomer Royal Frank Dyson for the Greenwich Observatory. Thomas Mercer Chronometers sold many ‘white label’ pieces to middlemen, retailers who would put their own name on the dial of a chronometer made completely by TMC. Many of these were very successful at the Greenwich Trials, but the prizes did not go to TMC. Before judging an horological competition in Paris, Tom caught an infection and died there in 1900.

No.1 of the Limited edition of Mercer Marine chronometers to celebrate the Silver Jubilee of Queen Elizabeth II, 1977.

Frank Anthony Mercer examining a sextant. Thomas Mercer's regulator is in the background.

In 1914, Sir Ernest Shackleton set off on the Imperial Trans-Antarctic Expedition. After his ship, the Endurance, was trapped and wrecked in pack ice, they somehow reached Elephant Island. To get assistance for his stranded men, he heroically journeyed in a whaleboat, the James Caird, to South Georgia. He navigated with the Thomas Mercer chronometer he carried under his jerkin.

In 1916, while serving in Egypt, Frank received a telegram from the Admiralty stating that the best way he could serve his country was to return home immediately and industrialise British chronometer production, to avoid an imminent shortage.

By the 1980s, they had made a third of all chronometers in history. TMC was by far the most prolific chronometer maker ever; although it was first in terms of quantity, the firm stood also for quality and exclusivity – particularly during the years after World War II when limited series and unique pieces were introduced into its range of products.

== Present day ==
After a period without production, TMC was revived in 2012, and it now makes high-end chronometers for the luxury market with precious materials, with an emphasis on yachting. Although the UK no longer has a chronometer certification/testing system as the Greenwich Trials were suspended at the start of World War I and never reinstated, pinpoint accuracy is still a crucial feature of the 21st century chronometer.

In 2013, TMC reunited with the Sir Ernest Shackleton team, its patron his granddaughter the Hon Alexandra Shackleton and led by Tim Jarvis. It re-enacted the original high-risk voyage, using again a Mercer chronometer.
