= Remontoire =

Part of accurate clock or watch

In mechanical chronometry, a remontoire (from the French remonter, meaning 'to wind') is a small secondary source of power, a weight or spring, which runs the timekeeping mechanism and is itself periodically rewound by the timepiece's main power source, such as a mainspring. It was used in a few precision clocks and watches to place the source of power closer to the escapement, thereby increasing the accuracy by evening out variations in drive force caused by unevenness of the friction in the geartrain. In spring-driven precision clocks, a gravity remontoire is sometimes used to replace the uneven force delivered by the mainspring running down by the more constant force of gravity acting on a weight. In turret clocks, it serves to separate the large forces needed to drive the hands from the modest forces needed to drive the escapement which keeps the pendulum swinging. A remontoire should not be confused with a maintaining power spring, which is used only to keep the timepiece going while it is being wound.

== How it works ==
Remontoires are used because the timekeeping mechanism in clocks and watches, the pendulum or balance wheel, is never isochronous; its rate is affected by changes in the drive force applied to it. In spring-driven timepieces, the drive force declines as the mainspring runs down. In weight-driven clocks the drive force, provided by a weight suspended by a cord, is more constant, but imperfections in the gear train and variations in lubrication also cause small variations. In turret clocks, the large hands, which are attached to the clock's wheel train, are exposed to the weather on the outside of the tower, so winds and accumulations of ice and snow apply disturbing forces to the hands, which are passed on to the wheel train.

With a remontoire, the only force applied to the clock's escapement is that of the remontoire's spring or weight, so that it is isolated from any variations in the main power source or wheel train, which is just used to rewind the remontoire. Remontoires are designed to rewind frequently, at intervals between one second and an hour. The rewinding process is triggered automatically when the remontoire's weight or spring reaches the end of its power. This frequent rewinding is another source of accuracy, because it averages out any variations in the clock's rate due to changes in the force of the remontoire itself. If the rate of the clock varies as the remontoire spring runs down, this variation will be repeated again and again, each time the remontoire goes through its cycle, so it will have no effect on the long term rate of the clock.

== History ==
The gravity remontoire was invented by Swiss clockmaker Jost Bürgi around 1595. Usually the "Kalenderuhr" (three month running, springdriven, calendar-desk-clock) Bürgi is considered the oldest surviving clock with a remontoire, even if it does not provide power to the escapement during the few seconds of the daily cycle where the remontoire weight gets wound up by the spring. Today remontoire mechanisms are all designed to deliver power to the escapement during the remontoire reset cycle.

The spring remontoire was invented by English clockmaker John Harrison during development of his H2 marine chronometer in 1739. Harrison's working drawing of the device is preserved in the Library of the Worshipful Company of Clockmakers in London, England. Harrison applied the remontoire again in what is known as H4.

Thomas Mudge also worked with remontoires. He stated in his 1765 publication 'Thoughts on the Means of Improving Watches, and More Particularly Those for the Use of the Sea', “The force derived from the main-spring should be made as equal as possible, by making the main-spring wind up another smaller spring at a less distance from the balance, at short intervals of time.”

Abraham-Louis Breguet used remontoires in clocks, however, not in watches.

Many French and Swiss pocketwatches after 1860 were stamped on the back with the word Remontoire. This merely meant that they didn't have to be wound with a key (i.e. they were wound by the then-novel winding crown inside the pendant). Etymologically the term is correct, the mainspring is "rewound" by some other force than a key, but these watches usually do not contain a remontoire as the word is used today.

== Remontoires in contemporary horology ==
The remontoire played an enormous role in British independent watchmaker Derek Pratt's oeuvre. He worked on a remontoire-powered aircraft clock with Andrew Fell and was familiar with the mechanism from early on in his career. He was the first watchmaker in history to integrate a remontoire directly inside the tourbillon carriage in the Urban Jürgensen Pocket Watch No. 1. He worked on this for three years, completing it in 1982. The mechanism is controlled by a ruby cut to the form of a Reuleaux triangle. The remontoire is again featured in Pratt’s Double-Wheel Remontoir Tourbillon, a pocket watch he created in 1997 as his contribution to the competition known as the Prix Abraham-Louis Breguet. A remontoire is also in what is often referred to as Pratt’s magnum opus, The Oval pocket watch, officially named ‘Detent Escapement Tourbillon with Remontoir in an Oval Case.’ This watch sold at auction in November 2024, for 3,690,000 Swiss francs (then about $4,200,000).

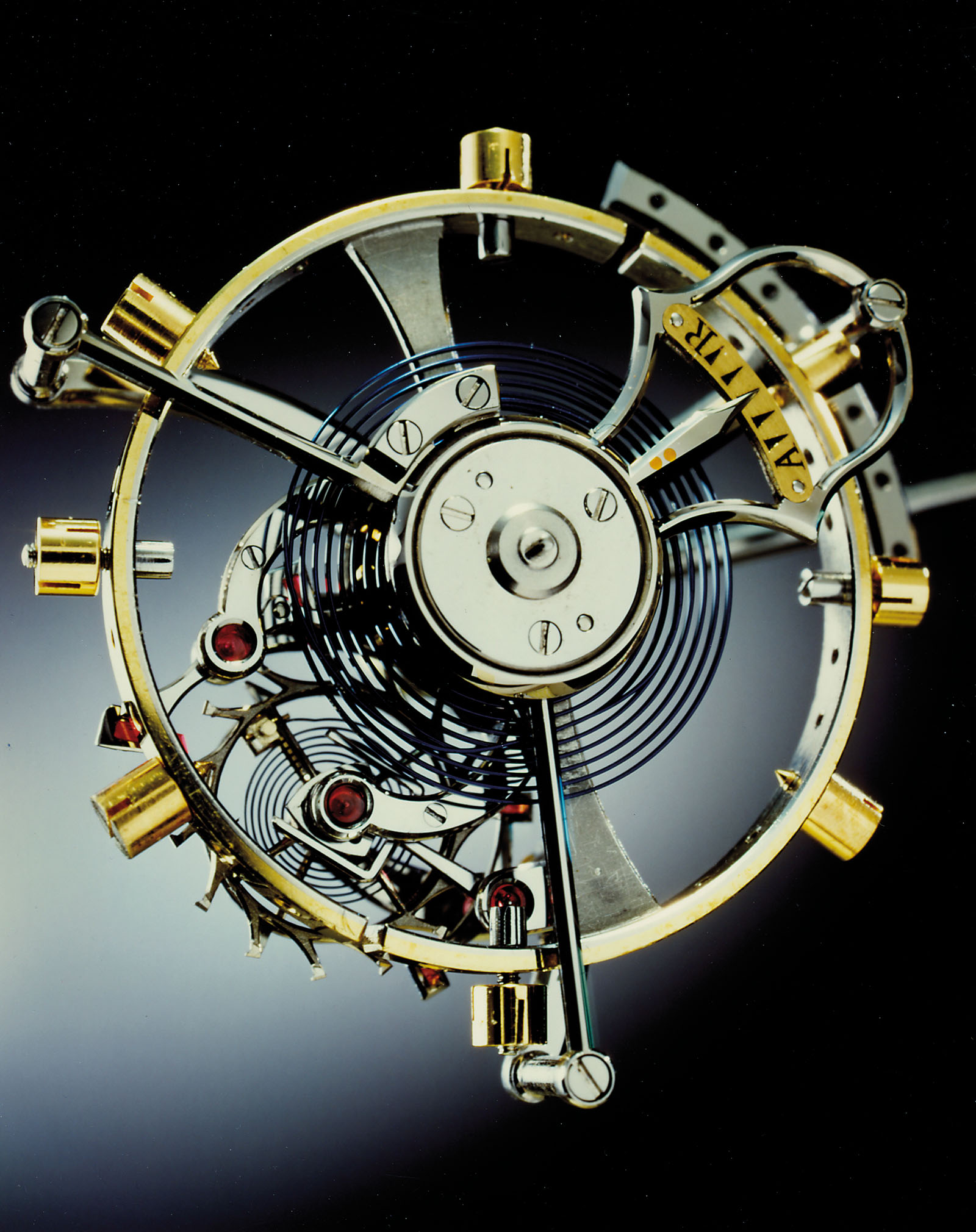
Remontoire carriage of a tourbillon pocket watch made by Derek Pratt.

== Types ==
Remontoires are distinguished by their power source:

- A gravity remontoire is one that uses a weight for power. It is used in precision pendulum clocks.
- A spring remontoire uses a spring. It is the only type which can be used in watches, since the force of a weight would be disturbed by motions of the wearer's wrist
- An electric remontoire can be either a gravity or spring type. In it, the weight or spring is rewound electrically, with a motor or solenoid. It is used in clocks with traditional mechanical movements which are run on electricity.

They can also be classified by where in the wheel train the remontoire is located:

- An escapement remontoire applies its force directly to the escape wheel of the escapement. Spring remontoires were usually of this type.
- A train remontoire applies its force to one of the wheels upstream from the escapement, usually to the wheel that drives the escape wheel.

== Electric remontoires in automobile clocks ==
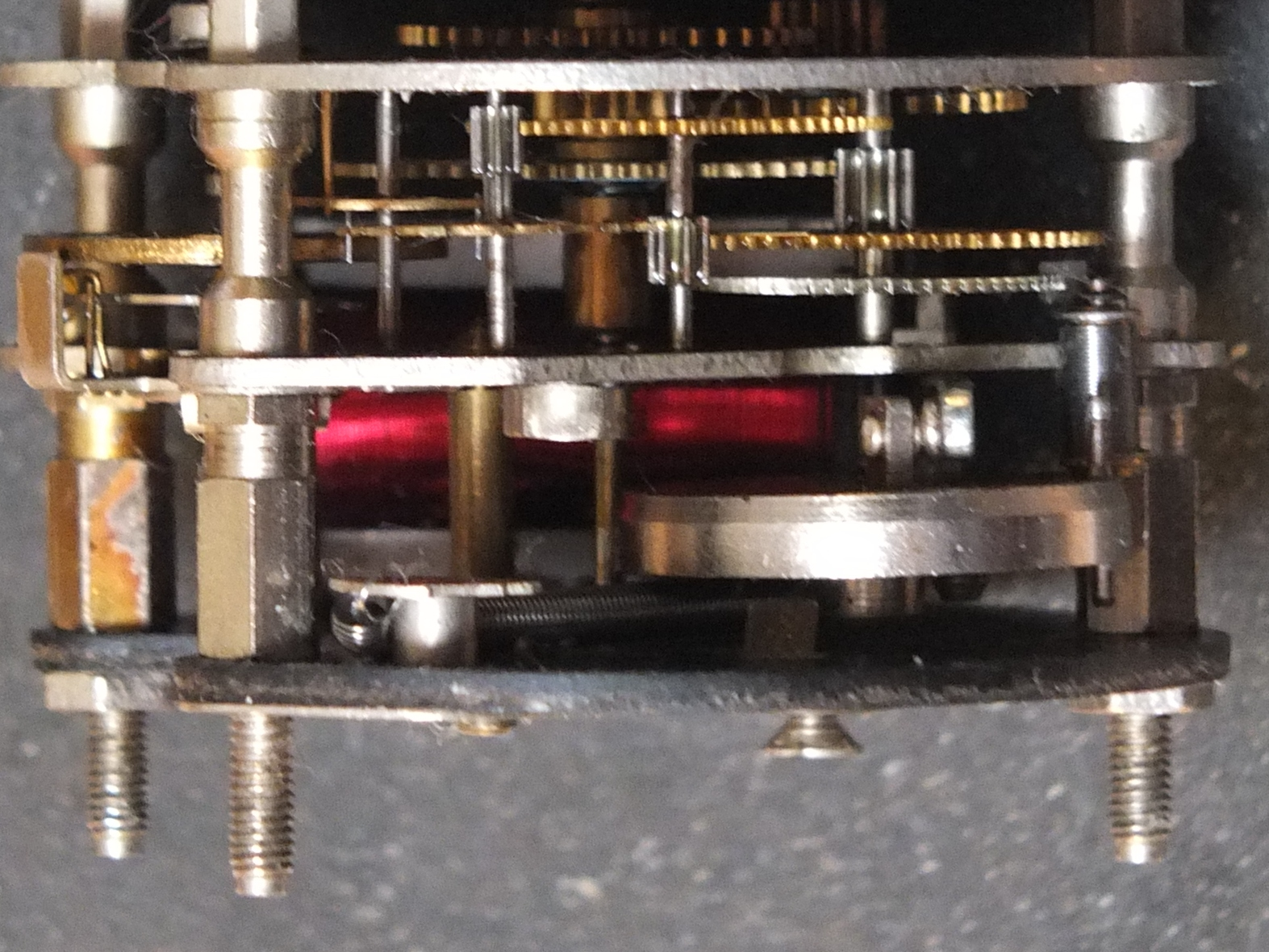
Internal mechanisms of an electric remontoire clock from a 1960s Rover P4 – the red solenoid is visible at the back and the switch points, through which the solenoid winds the spring, are to the right and in their closed position

Before the common use of electronic clocks in automobiles, automobile clocks had mechanical movements, powered by an electric remontoire. A low power drive spring would be wound every few minutes by a plunger in a solenoid, powered by the vehicle's service battery and activated by a switch when the spring tension got too low. Such clocks were, however, notoriously inaccurate, typically being made as cheaply as possible.

Many Rover (P4 to P6), Ford (Mk1 Escort, Mk2 Cortina, and Mk1 Capri GT/RS), and Triumph (Dolomite, 2000/2500, and Stag), as well as some Jaguar (S3 E-type), Daimler (DS420), and Aston Martin (V8) cars were fitted with Kienzle clocks that were wound by such electric remontoires.
