= Corpus Clock =

Sculptural clock in Cambridge, England

Coordinates: 52°12.2256′N 0°7.0584′E

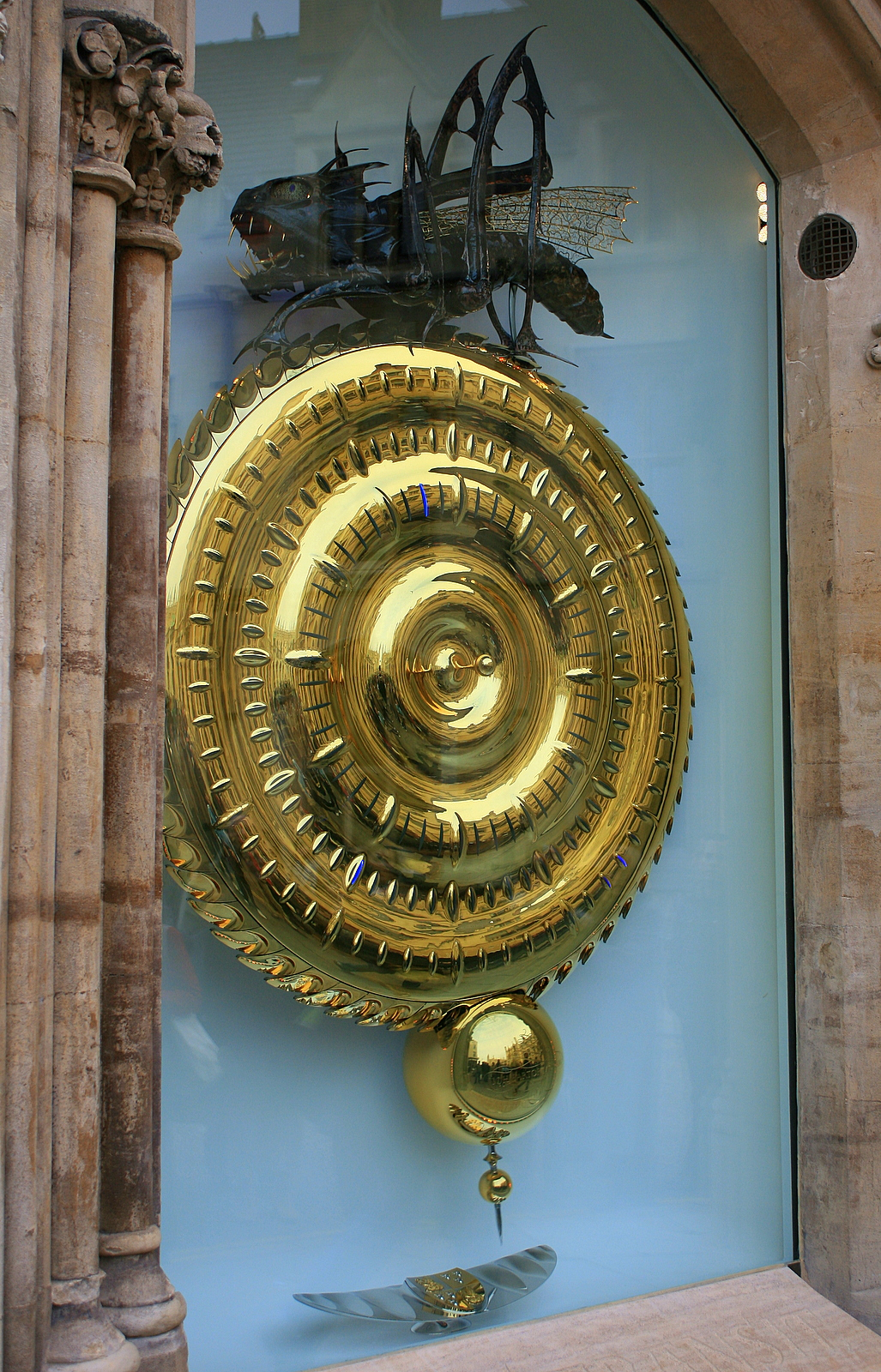
The Corpus Clock at Corpus Christi College, Cambridge

The Corpus Clock, also known as the Chronophage or the Grasshopper clock, is a large sculptural clock on the outside of the Taylor Library at Corpus Christi College, University of Cambridge, in England. It is at street level at the junction of Bene't Street and Trumpington Street, looking out over King's Parade, Cambridge. The clock was conceived and funded by John Taylor, an alumnus and honorary fellow of the college.

It was officially unveiled to the public on 19 September 2008 by Cambridge physicist Stephen Hawking. The clock was named one of Time's Best Inventions of 2008.

== Appearance ==
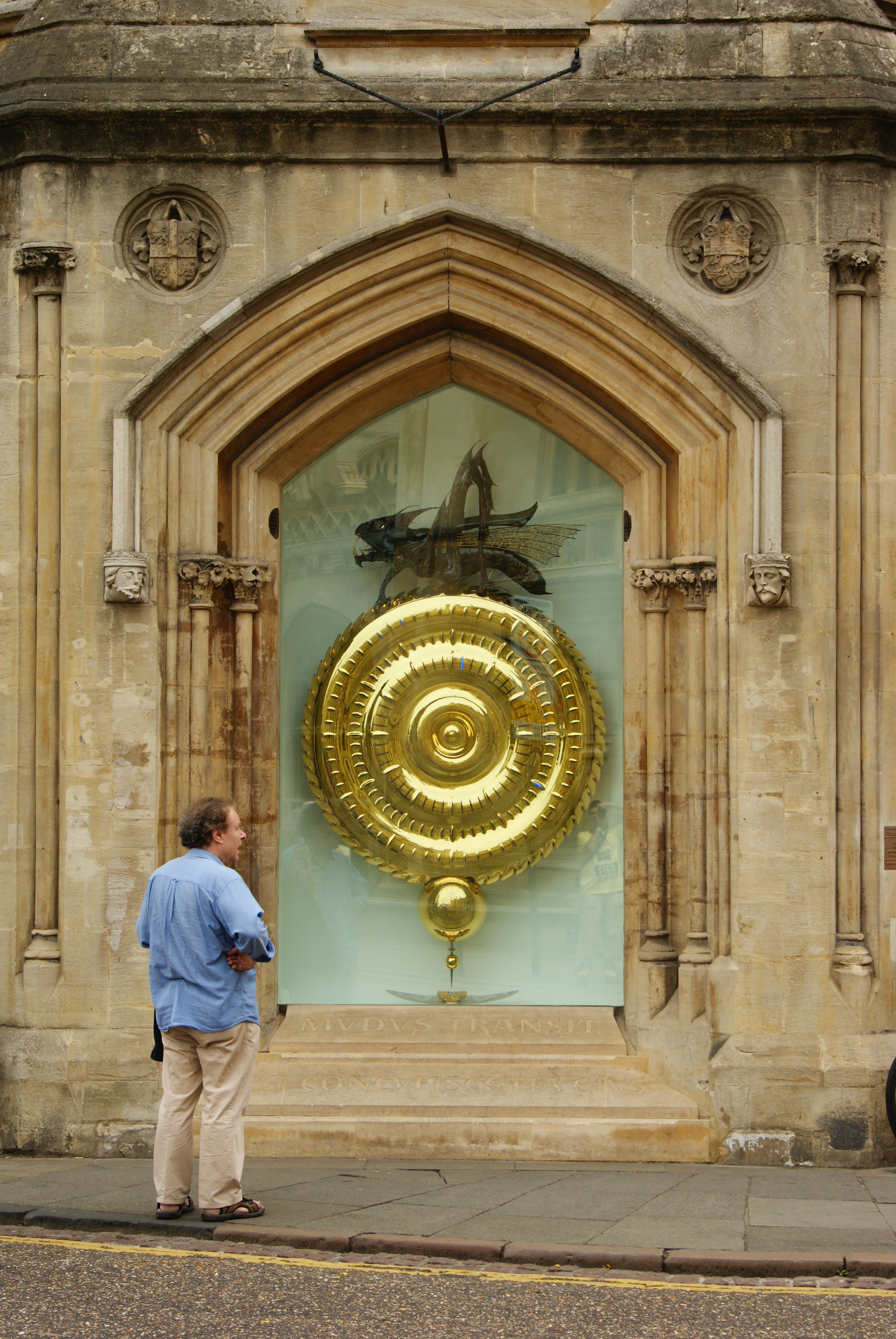
The Corpus Clock with a man for scale

The clock's face is a rippling 24-carat gold-plated stainless steel disc, about 1.5 metres (4.9 ft) in diameter. It has no hands or numerals, but displays the time by opening individual slits in the clock face backlit with blue LEDs; these slits are arranged in three concentric rings displaying hours, minutes, and seconds.

Video

The dominant visual feature of the clock is a grim-looking metal sculpture of an insectoid creature akin to a grasshopper or locust. The sculpture is actually the clock's escapement (see below). Taylor calls this beast the Chronophage (literally "time eater", from the Greek χρόνος [chronos] time, and εφάγον [ephagon] I ate). It moves its mouth, appearing to "eat up" the seconds as they pass, and occasionally "blinks" in seeming satisfaction. The creature's constant motion produces an eerie grinding sound that suits its task. The hour is tolled by the sound of a chain clanking into a small wooden coffin hidden in the back of the clock.

Below the clock is a Latin inscription from the Vulgate 1 John 2:17: mundus transit et concupiscentia eius ("the world passeth away, and the lust thereof").

The clock is entirely accurate only once every five minutes. The rest of the time, the pendulum may seem to catch or stop, and the lights may lag or, then, race to get ahead. According to Taylor, this erratic motion reflects life's "irregularity".

Conceived as a work of public art, the Chronophage reminds viewers in a dramatic way of the inevitable passing of time. Taylor deliberately designed it to be "terrifying": "Basically I view time as not on your side. He'll eat up every minute of your life, and as soon as one has gone he's salivating for the next." It has been described as "hypnotically beautiful and deeply disturbing".

The clock sits in what used to be the entrance to a bank branch built in 1866 (designed by architect Horace Francis) that originally housed the London and County Bank. Corpus redeveloped the site to improve student library provision at the college after NatWest's lease ended in 2005.

== Mechanics of the clock ==
Simplified animation of the escapement, and "second" and "minute" discs. For clarity, each "minute" is divided into only 10 "seconds", each 6 times longer than an ordinary second, and the "minute" disc is folded to the right. The green lines represent slots in the rotating discs, while the blue lines represent fixed slots.

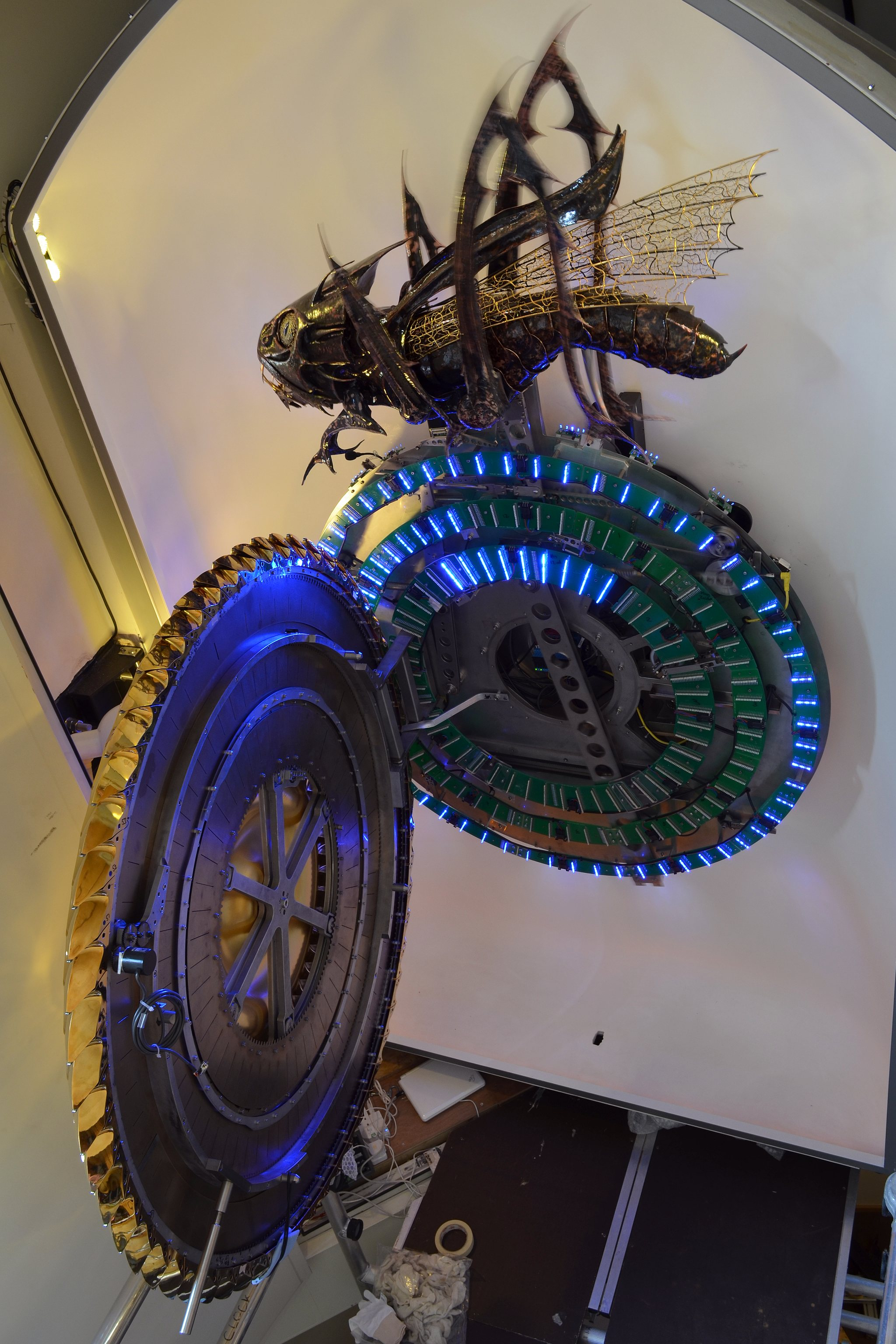
Opened to show its interior

The Corpus Clock is a product of traditional mechanical clockmaking. It features the world's largest grasshopper escapement, a low-friction mechanism for converting pendulum motion into rotational motion while at the same time giving back to the pendulum the energy needed to maintain its swing. The grasshopper escapement was an invention of the renowned eighteenth-century clockmaker John Harrison, and Taylor intended the Corpus Clock to be a homage to Harrison's work. Since "no one knows how a grasshopper escapement works", Taylor "decided to turn the clock inside out" so that the escapement, and the escape wheel it turns, would be his clock's defining feature.

The Corpus Clock's clockwork is entirely mechanically controlled, without any computer programming, and electricity is used only to power a motor, which winds up the mechanism, and to power the blue LEDs that shine behind the slits in the clock's face. The clock has many unexpected and innovative features; for example, the pendulum briefly stops at apparently irregular intervals, and the Chronophage moves its mouth and blinks its eyes. Taylor explains it as follows:

The gold eyelids travel across the eye and disappear again in an instant; if you are not watching carefully you will not even notice... Sometimes you will even see two blinks in quick succession. The Blink is performed by a hidden spring drive, controlled in the best tradition of seventeenth century clockmakers of London. The spring is coiled up inside a housing that can be seen mounted on the large gearwheel visibly protruding from the bottom of the mechanism. As the huge pendulum below the Clock rocks the Chronophage as he steps round the great escapewheel, each backward and forward movement is used by sprag clutches to wind up the drive spring. A position step prevents the spring from being overwound yet allows the spring to be ready at an instant to drive the Blink. The mechanism is released by a countwheel with semi random spacing so the Blink takes place at any position in the to- and fro- motion of the pendulum. A further countwheel mechanism chooses a single or a double blink whilst the air damper at the top of the gear train slows the action to a realistic pace.

The Corpus Clock is expected to be able to run accurately for at least two hundred years.

== Funding and realisation ==
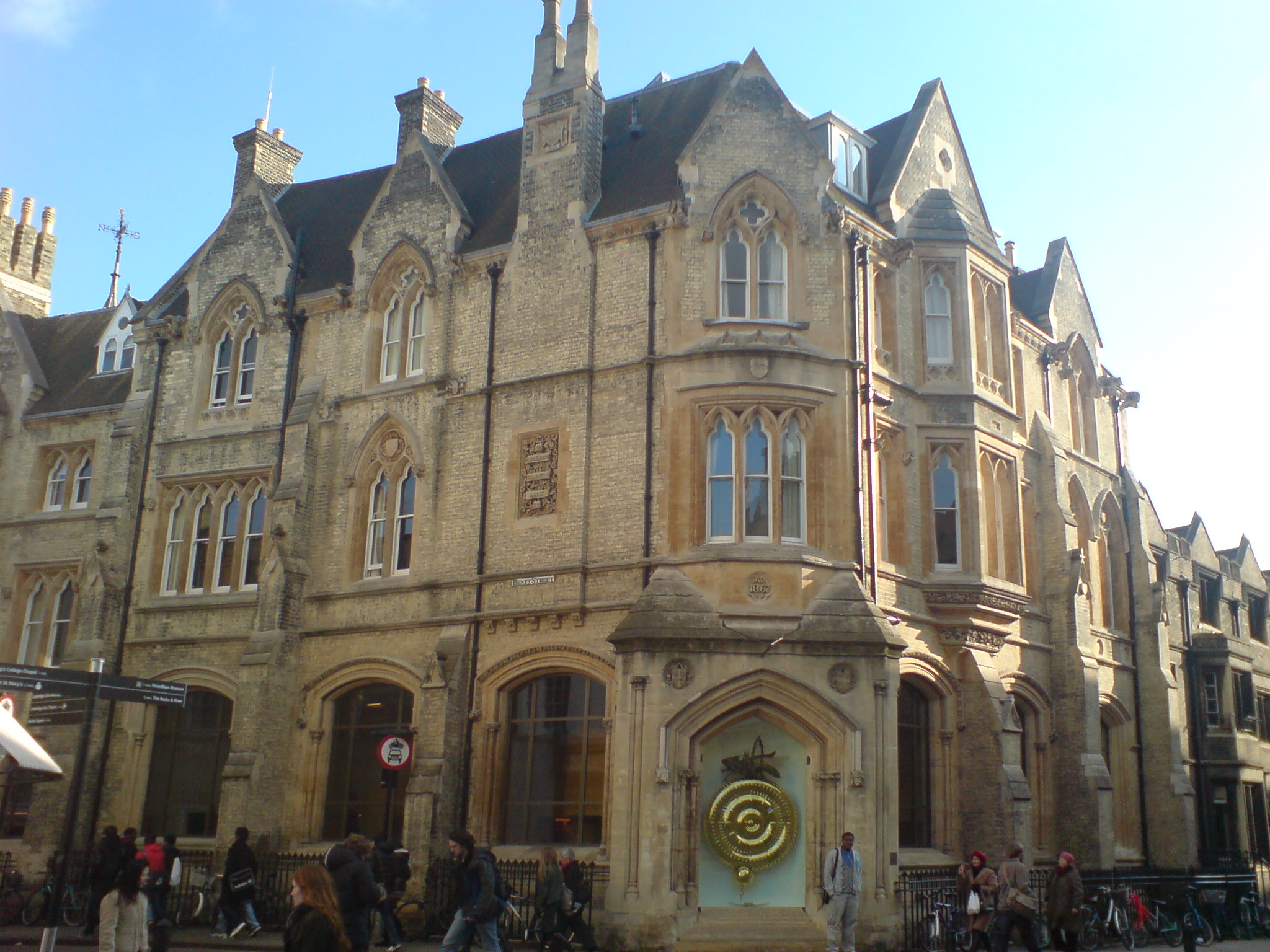
The Taylor Library and the Corpus Clock on the northwest corner of Corpus Christi College; the facade was a bank branch, built in 1866 by architect Horace Francis

Taylor invested five years and £1 million in the Corpus Clock project, and two hundred people, including engineers, sculptors, scientists, jewellers, and calligraphers, were involved. The clockwork incorporates six new patented inventions. The rippling gold-plated dial was made by explosive forming–using an explosive charge to press a thin sheet of stainless steel onto a mould underwater at a "secret military research institute in Holland." Stewart Huxley was the design engineer. Sculptor Matthew Sanderson modelled the Chronophage. The graticule, or measuring dish, for the Corpus Clock was designed and created by Alan Meeks of Visitech Design. It was machined in aluminium and silver before being plated with gold and rhodium. Matters relating to the Corpus Clock are dealt with by the Custodian of the Corpus Chronophage Clock, a post currently held by Ewan St. John Smith.

There are sisters to the Corpus Chronophage including the Dragon Chronophage that Taylor installed in the oval mansion Arragon Mooar House he built on the Isle of Man and the Midsummer Chronophage, which was displayed at 1886 Bar and Restaurant in Regent Street, Douglas, Isle of Man, from December 2020 to January 2023.

== In popular culture ==
The clock is featured in the Hindi movie Paa, the associated music video "Mudi Mudi", and is shown briefly in the third episode of the television series Zero Hour and in the fifth episode of the Chinese television series Here to Heart. The clock is also featured as a plot element in the alternate history novel The Quantum Curators and the Fabergé Egg by Eva St. John.
