= Laurence Sulivan (1783–1866) =

British statesman and philanthropist

Laurence Sulivan PC (1783–1866) was a British statesman and philanthropist, Deputy Secretary at War.

He was the grandson of Laurence Sulivan MP, chairman of the East India Company.

He was the Deputy Secretary at War.

He endowed the "Elizabethan Ragged School" (now the Castle Club), Broomhouse Lane, Fulham, London, named in honour of his wife Elizabeth Temple, the younger sister of the Prime Minister Lord Palmerston. It later became a school for tubercular children run by the LCC and then a youth club.
