= Grasshopper escapement =

Low friction clock escapement

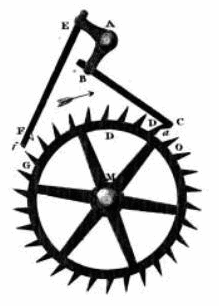
Grasshopper escapement, 1820

The grasshopper escapement is a low-friction escapement for pendulum clocks invented by British clockmaker John Harrison around 1722. An escapement, part of every mechanical clock, is the mechanism that gives the clock's pendulum periodic pushes to keep it swinging, and each swing releases the clock's gears to move forward by a fixed amount, thus moving the hands forward at a steady rate. The grasshopper escapement was used in a few regulator clocks built during Harrison's time, and a few others over the years, but has never seen wide use. The term "grasshopper" in this connection, apparently from the kicking action of the pallets, first appears in the Horological Journal in the late 19th century.

== History ==
John Harrison used the grasshopper escapement in his regulator clocks, and also for the first three of his marine timekeepers, H1 - H3. Determining longitudinal position was a major problem in marine navigation; Newton argued that astronomical positioning could be used, but an easier theoretical possibility was to use accurate knowledge of the time at a specific base location. The difference in time between local time, which was easy to measure, and the time at the base gives the difference in longitude between the base and the ship, since 24 hours of time is equivalent to 360 degrees of longitude. A large prize was offered for a solution to the problem and Harrison devoted his life to devising and building highly accurate timekeepers. Precision and friction were the main problems. Two advantages of the grasshopper escapement are the repeatability of its operation and that it does not need lubrication. The repeatability of its operation is inherent in its design. One pallet is released only by the engagement of the other; the impulse given to the pendulum is thus completely regular in its timing. Lubricants available to Harrison were poor, messy and short-lived. This meant that conventional clocks had to be stopped frequently for cleaning and oiling. Using his clean and absolutely stable grasshopper escapement Harrison began a series of long-term investigations into the performance of clocks, leading to his invention of the gridiron pendulum which counteracted the effects of expansion and contraction with changing temperature. The performance of his improved clocks in turn gave him an accurate, convenient standard against which to test his marine timekeepers.

== Operation ==
Animation of a grasshopper escapement in motion. This shows a modified version which has counterweighted pallet arms and spring stops.

Harrison developed the grasshopper escapement from a conventional anchor escapement which he built for a turret clock to go in the stable block at Brocklesby Hall in Lincolnshire. This proved to be unreliable, needing repeated attention by which Harrison was inconvenienced, so around 1722 he modified the escapement by putting a hinge in the middle of each arm of the anchor. The hinged pallets both pointed the same way, opposing the rotation of the escape wheel. As the escape wheel pushes the pallet, the hinge moves away from the escape wheel. The pallet pivots about its contact point with the wheel as it pushes the anchor. At the same time, the other pallet is approaching the wheel. When it contacts the wheel, it pushes it backwards slightly and contact between the wheel and the first pallet is broken. Both the pallets are slightly tail-heavy so that they naturally tend to move away from the wheel. The first pallet therefore moves out of the path of the escape wheel and the job of impulsing the pendulum passes to the second pallet.

The first pallet comes to rest against a stop which holds it in the correct position so that when the pendulum is reaching the end of its travel, pushed by the second pallet, the first pallet swings down into the path of the wheel again. It makes contact with the wheel and, driven by the momentum of the pendulum, pushes the wheel backwards slightly. This releases the second pallet, which retires gracefully to its stop, having transferred the task of impulsing the pendulum to the first pallet again. The small movement of the pallet on its hinge involves far less friction than the sliding contact in a conventional escapement; it needs no lubrication and there is so little wear that Harrison was able to make his pallets from wood. One of the original pallets at Brocklesby Park was still working when the clock was renovated in 2005 while the other was only replaced following an accident in 1880. Harrison later modified the layout of the escapement by having one pallet pull rather than push, putting a little hook at the end of the pivoted arm to contact the teeth of the escape wheel. He also put both hinge axes together on a common pin.

When the pallet is pushing the escape wheel backwards it is also being driven hard against its stop. To prevent wear, or damage, the stops are designed to give way. Each stop is hinged about the same axis as its pallet. The pallets are tail-heavy but the stops are nose-heavy, tending to fall towards the wheel. The stops are sufficiently nose-heavy that the combination of pallet plus stop also tends to fall towards the wheel but this is prevented by a fixed pin on the anchor. This means that the pin holds the stop which holds the pallet in just the right place to engage cleanly with the escape wheel. When the pallet meets the wheel, it pushes the wheel backwards and as it does it lifts the stop off its pin. When the wheel then pushes the pallet, the stop comes back down onto its pin and parts company with its pallet. Each stop is also lifted off its pin once in each cycle by the momentum of the arriving pallet.

== Limitations ==
The tendency of the pallets to move out of the way of the wheel has some serious consequences. The first is that any time that the drive to the escape wheel is interrupted the pallets lose contact and when the drive is restored, the escape wheel may not be restrained and may accelerate rapidly and uncontrollably. To prevent this happening while the clock was being wound, Harrison invented one of his longest-lasting mechanisms, a maintaining power which is still widely used in clocks and watches. In its usual construction this consists of a ratchet wheel sandwiched between, and co-axial with, the first (and slowest-turning) driving gear of the movement and the barrel that the weight (or spring) is attached to. When the clock is wound, the barrel goes backwards and a ratchet on the maintaining wheel slips over teeth cut on the barrel. The first gear is still driven forward however because there is a spring between the maintaining wheel and the first gear which pushes against it. As it does so it tries to push the maintaining wheel backwards. This is prevented from happening by a pawl fixed to the frame of the clock which engages with teeth cut round the edge of the maintaining wheel. Once the clock is fully wound, pressure on the key is released and the barrel drives the maintaining wheel and the first gear in the normal way. It also rewinds the maintaining spring ready for the next time the clock is wound. During normal operation the pawl that stops the maintaining wheel from going backwards simply slips over the teeth of the maintaining wheel.

The second consequence of the pallets' tendency to move out of the way of the wheel is that when the clock runs down and stops both pallets return to their stops. Unless the ends of one or both pallets are long enough to sit into the gap between the teeth of the escape wheel then the wheel will run free as soon as the clock is wound. The same problem can arise if the hinges for the stops get dirty and stick in their raised position.

In common with other less accurate escapements, the grasshopper pushes the pendulum back and forth throughout its cycle; it is never allowed to swing freely. This disturbs the pendulum's natural motion as a harmonic oscillator. Around the same time as Harrison invented the grasshopper, George Graham introduced an improved version of the deadbeat escapement, originally invented by Richard Towneley in 1675, which allowed the pendulum to swing virtually undisturbed during most of its cycle. This accurate escapement became the standard in precision regulator clocks.

Because of these various idiosyncrasies, the grasshopper escapement was never used widely. Harrison used it in his prototype marine chronometers, H1 - H3, and Justin and Benjamin Vulliamy made a small number of regulators using Harrison's design.

== John Taylor's Corpus Clock ==
A unique public clock built as a tribute to John Harrison's grasshopper escapement, the Corpus Clock, was unveiled at Corpus Christi College, Cambridge University, in Cambridge, England on 19 September 2008. Industrialist John Taylor spent £1 million building the mechanical clock. Feeling that Harrison's escapement was not well enough known, the clock's grasshopper escapement is exposed on the top of the clock, built in the form of a demonic grasshopper called the "Chronophage" or "time eater", which rhythmically opens and closes its jaws, representing time being devoured.

The clock, 1.5 metres in diameter, has many other notable features. It has no hands, but rather uses three concentric pairs of stacked annular disks—one pair each for hours, minutes and seconds—slotted and lensed to allow the selective escape of light from an enclosed, continuously lit set of light emitting diodes. The arrangement of slots in each disk, along with the rotation of the foremost disk of each pair, creates a Vernier effect, producing the illusion of lights rotating at various speeds about three concentric circumferences on the clock's face.

The pendulum speeds up, slows down, and sometimes stops, but returns to the correct time every five minutes. Taylor designed the clock to remind himself of his own mortality.

== Parmigiani Senfine ==
A grasshopper-type escapement is used in an entirely new mechanism intended for wristwatches. This new type of mechanical regulator uses flexible structures both in the escapement and the oscillator. A silicon wheel oscillates about 86,400 times an hour, approximately three times faster than in conventional wristwatches. The initial development was done at the Swiss Center for Electronics and Microtechnology (CSEM) with Pierre Genequand, a Swiss physicist, as lead inventor. By eliminating friction as much as possible, such a watch can run for more than a month after rewinding, an exceptional power-reserve. The prototype of such a new calibre (movement) has been exhibited by Parmigiani Fleurier.

== Burgess Clock B ==
A grasshopper escapement is an essential part of a sculptural clock by Martin Burgess, known as Burgess Clock B. One of a pair based on the technology of the late regulator clock by John Harrison, it was completed by Charles Frodsham & Company at the request of its owner, Donald Saff. After successful testing there it was transferred to the Royal Observatory, Greenwich for a detailed assessment of its long-term performance. This was overseen by the Worshipful Company of Clockmakers and the National Physical Laboratory, whose representatives attached tamper-proof seals to the case of the clock. Although the clock is electrically wound, thus preventing any disturbance whatever of the clock during the assessment, it is otherwise entirely mechanical. At the end of a period of one hundred days, the maximum error had not exceeded five-eighths of a second - no allowance for a steady drift of time (rate) having had to be applied. As a result, on the 18th of April 2015, the Guinness World Records organisation presented a World Record certificate to Martin Burgess for having made the most accurate purely mechanical clock working in free air. The clock remains at the ROG; in 2017 it was moved to the gallery containing the Harrison marine timekeepers where its performance continues to be monitored.
