= Horace Francis =

British architect

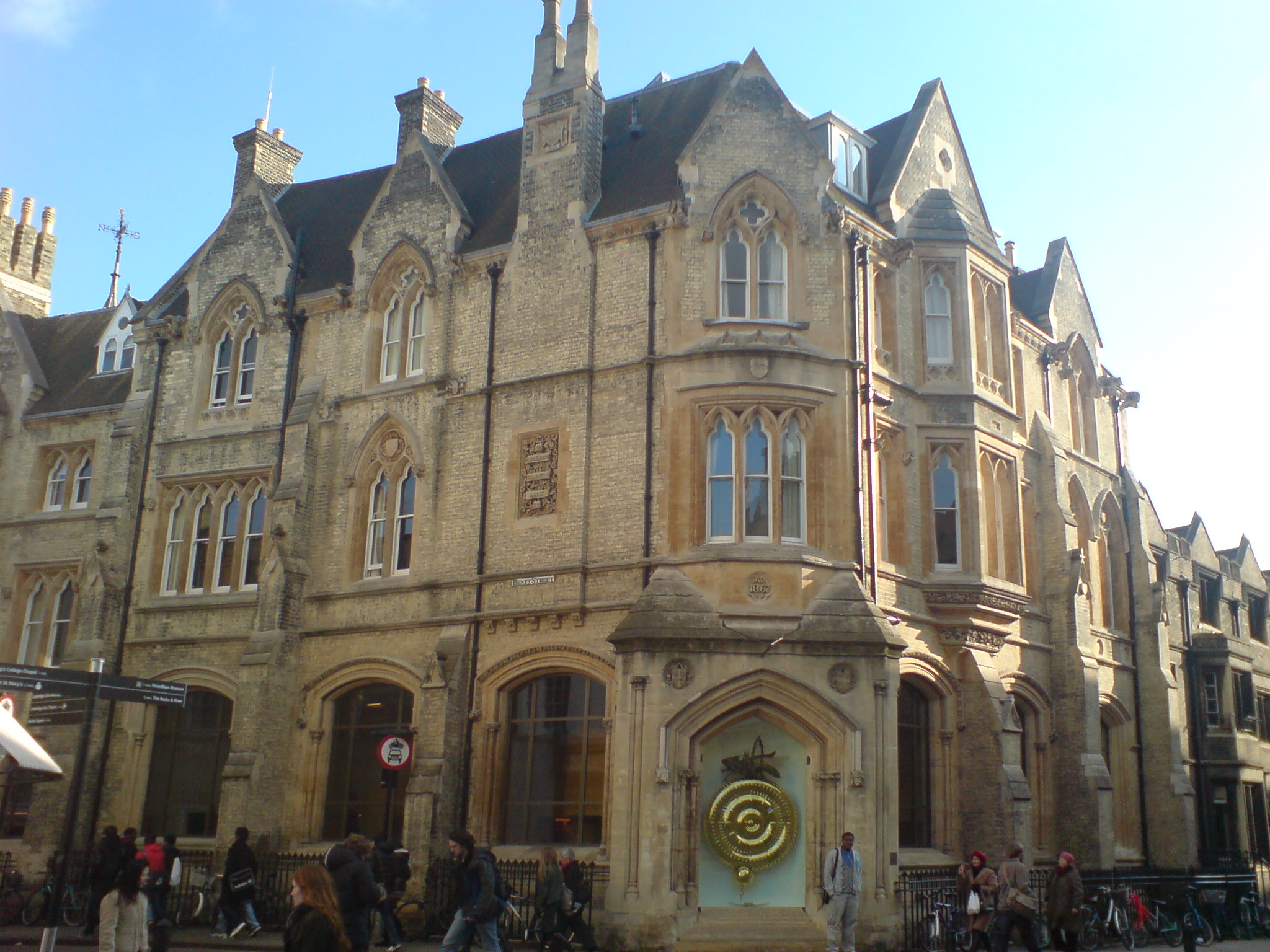
London and County Bank branch in Cambridge (1866), now the Taylor Library of Corpus Christi College, Cambridge with the Corpus Clock

Horace Francis (1821–1894) was a British architect, who often worked with his elder brother, fellow architect Frederick John Francis (1818–1896)

== Notable buildings ==
- Elizabethan Ragged School, Fulham, London (1855)
- St Elphin's Church, Warrington (1867)
- London & County Bank, High Street, Oxford (1867–68)
- St Mary's Church, Acton, London, (1865–7).
