= Jeremy Thacker =

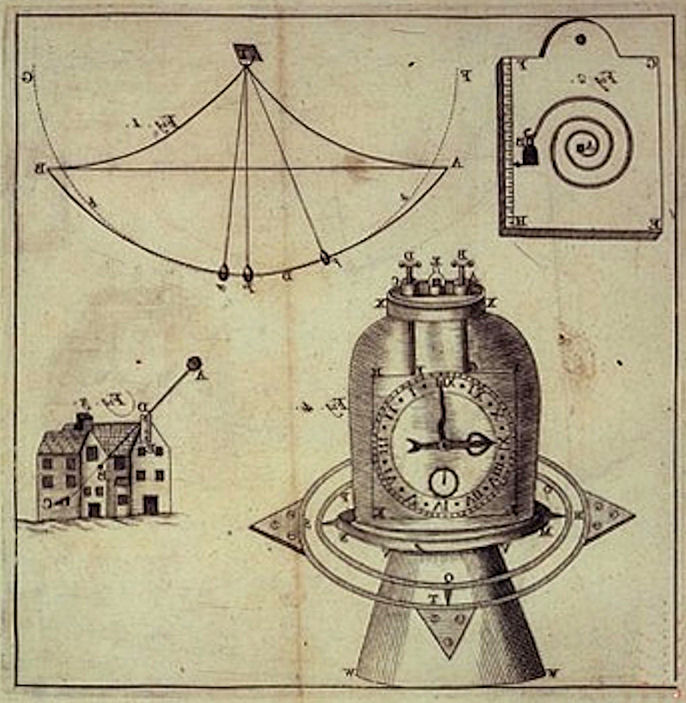
Chronometer of Jeremy Thacker c. 1714.

Jeremy Thacker was a possibly apocryphal 18th-century writer and watchmaker, who for a long time was believed to be the first to have coined the word "chronometer" for precise clocks designed to find longitude at sea, though an earlier reference by William Derham has now been found. Thacker is credited with writing The Longitudes Examin'd, published in London in 1714, in which the term 'chronometer' appears. In the work, the claim is made that Thacker created and extensively tested a marine chronometer positioned on gimbals and within a vacuum, and that sea trials would take place. It has been concluded by others that such tests must have resulted in failure. The idea of a vacuum for a marine clock had already been proposed by the Italian clockmaker Antimo Tempera in 1668. Slightly later, John Harrison would successfully build marine timekeepers from 1730.

== Question of authenticity ==
According to an article published in the Times Literary Supplement in November 2008, Pat Rogers argued that "Thacker may never have existed and his proposal now emerges possibly as a hoax?". Rogers argues Thacker was an invention of John Arbuthnot, and that The Longitudes Examined fell within the major tradition for satire, and that it was designed to send-up ambitious longitude projects. This view met with opposition from Jonathan Betts and Andrew King, both noted Harrisonians, who argued that, as Rogers acknowledged, there were in fact "convincing reasons for accepting the traditional view that some good science is dropped into the project".
