= John Taylor (inventor) =

British inventor, entrepreneur, horologist and philanthropist

John C. Taylor OBE FREng
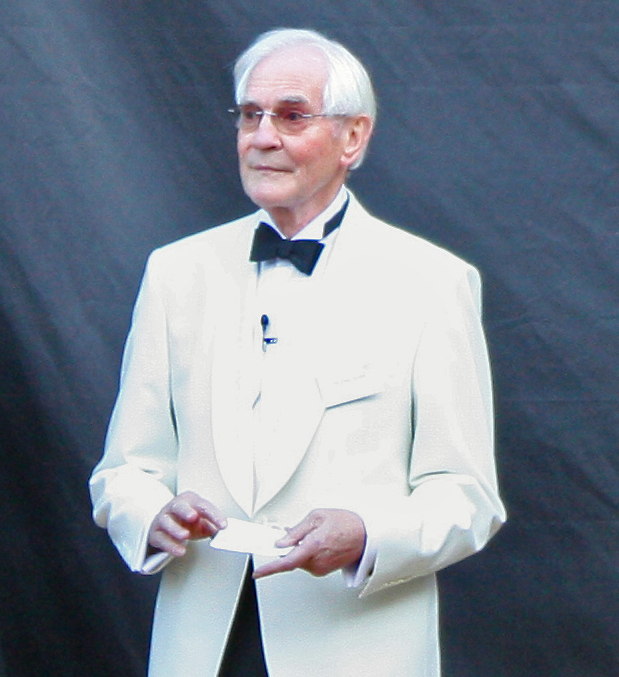
- Taylor in 2008
- Born: 25 November 1936 (age 89)
- Citizenship: British
- Education: Corpus Christi College, Cambridge
- Occupations: British inventor, entrepreneur, horologist and philanthropist
- Known for: Development of thermostatic controls Construction of the Corpus Clock
- Website: johnctaylor.com

John Crawshaw Taylor OBE FREng (born 25 November 1936) is an English inventor, entrepreneur, horologist and philanthropist best known for his extensive research into electric kettles.

== Early life ==
John C Taylor was born on 25 November 1936 in Buxton, Derbyshire to Eric Hardman Taylor (1904–1972) and Gwendolen Marjorie Jones (1904–1975). John had one older sister, Judith Sian Taylor (1934–2011).

When the Second World War commenced on 3 September 1939 it was decided that John would be sent to Canada along with his mother and sister. On 30 May 1940 they travelled to Montréal, Canada and settled in Belleville, Ontario until 28 January 1945 when they returned to England.

John was educated firstly at Belleville Kindergarten, then at Queen Alexandra School. Upon returning to England John studied at the Combs Village School. Following this John attended Holme Leigh Preparatory School before moving to the Isle of Man to attend King William's College. John was then accepted into Corpus Christi College, Cambridge from 1956 to 1959, where he graduated with a degree in Natural Sciences.

== Career ==
After graduating in 1959 Taylor had planned to continue his studies further, however at the last moment the funding was pulled and reluctantly he joined his father Eric's company Otter Controls as a Graduate Trainee. It is said that he "soon revealed himself to have inherited his father's inventive genius".

When Eric Taylor died in 1971, his son took over as Chairman of Otter Controls. He focused on the business of Castletown Thermostats, a subsidiary of Otter Controls, and in 1979 he split Castletown Thermostats and Otter Controls into two independent companies, with John Taylor becoming Chairman of Castletown. Two years later, Castletown Thermostats changed its name to Strix Ltd, and in 1984, Eddie Davies was appointed as Chief Executive, with Taylor remaining Chairman.

Castletown Thermostats had started by making bimetallic thermostats for use in various industries. In the 1960s, the market for electric kettles was growing, and Castletown extended its manufacturing plant to produce and test a new device for controlling kettles. During the 20 years from 1979 until 1999 in which Taylor and Davies led Strix, the company developed several successful product series, expanded worldwide, sold over 200 million thermostat controls for electric kettles, and received several Queen's Awards and other awards.

In 2001 Taylor received an Honorary Doctorate at UMIST and was made Visiting Professor of Innovation in recognition of over 150 patents in his own name. He was also elected Honorary Fellow of Corpus Christi College, Cambridge.

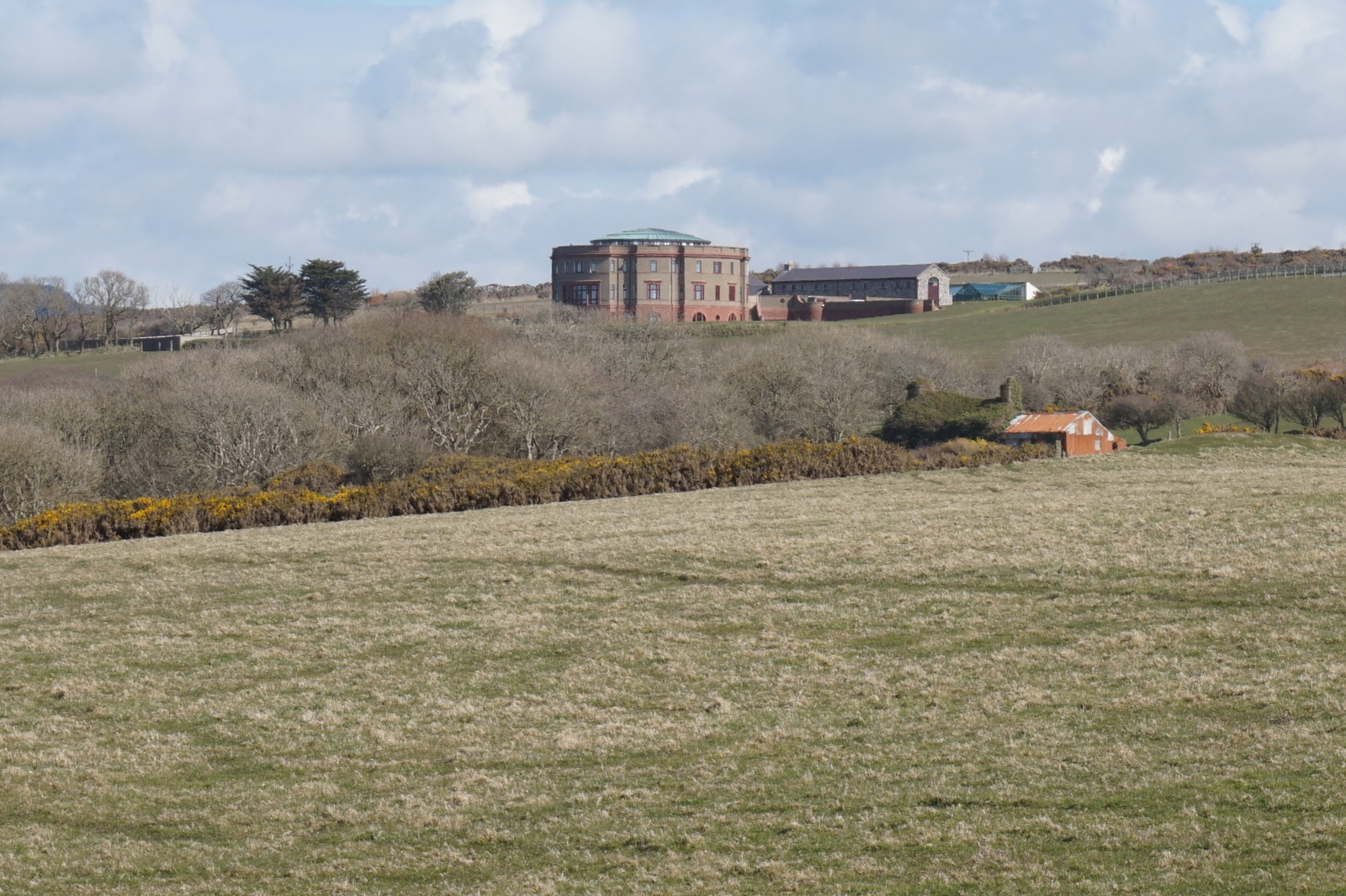
Arragon Mooar on the Isle of Man

In 2000, in a bid to expand into the new growth market of coffee makers, Strix raised £50m of capital from HSBC Private Equity by selling 40% of its shares, valuing the company at £125m. This investment diluted Taylor's shareholding in Strix to 24%. In 2005, ABN AMRO Capital led a leveraged buyout of Strix; the value of the transaction was not disclosed. Today, Strix employs 1000 people, holds over 600 patents, and turns over more than £100 million per year. Strix controls are incorporated into electric kettles from many leading manufacturers, and it is estimated that they are used over one billion times per day worldwide, by over 20% of the world's population.

On 29 May 2018 Taylor was the subject of the BBC Radio 4 programme The Life Scientific. Taylor, with the architect Julian Bicknell built an oval mansion, Arragon Mooar House, on the Isle of Man.

== Philanthropic activities ==
Since his retirement in 1999, Taylor focussed on using his wealth to support educational institutions in the UK. His 'generous donation' enabled the creation of the STRIX Centre for Manufacturing at UMIST which opened in 2003. He has also been a very active benefactor of his former Cambridge college, Corpus Christi, by contributing £2.5m towards the construction of a new student library, the Taylor Library as well as funding numerous undergraduate and postgraduate scholarships and bursaries. In 2017, the Royal Academy of Engineering named their newly refurbished Enterprise Hub after Taylor, in recognition of his donation that enabled the project.

He was appointed Officer of the Order of the British Empire (OBE) in the 2011 New Year Honours for services to business and horology.

== Horology and the Chronophage clocks ==
Taylor attracted public attention in September 2008 when the Corpus Clock, also known as the Chronophage, was installed on the outer wall of the Taylor Library of Corpus Christi College and unveiled by Stephen Hawking. John Taylor spent £1m of his own money in the construction of the Corpus Clock and gave it as a gift to the college.

The second in the series, the Midsummer Chronophage, depicts a science-fiction fly and was exhibited at the Saatchi Gallery, the Science Museum, London and the National Museum of Scotland. Like the Corpus Chronophage, its face is made from 24-carat gold plate on stainless steel.

The third is the Dragon Chronophage, exhibited in Shanghai on 27–30 March 2015 as part of Design Shanghai, China's premier design event. It features a Chinese dragon which appears to swallow a pearl every hour.

The fourth Chronophage is a private commission, and its details are currently being kept secret at the customer's request.

There are features that are common to all of the Chronophage clocks. They are all designed to show the grasshopper escapement, part of a conventional clock mechanism that was invented by John Harrison. The grasshopper escapement, which is usually internal, is externalised and appears to drag the escape wheel around the rim of the clock.

When building the Corpus Chronophage, Taylor found that the inertia issues presented by such a large grasshopper escapement made the mechanism unworkable. With reference to this problem, he has said, "We had to turn a disaster into an advantage. Our efforts to prevent the amplitude of the pendulum from increasing led us to the idea of running both fast and slow and correcting them." The final outcome was a mechanical clock that is assisted by mechanical controls and a periodic signal from the atomic clock at the UK's National Physical Laboratory. All of the Chronophage clocks use this method of telling time, which allows Taylor to explore the concept of relative time as theorised by Albert Einstein.
