= Castle Club =

Coordinates: 51.468187°N 0.196928°W

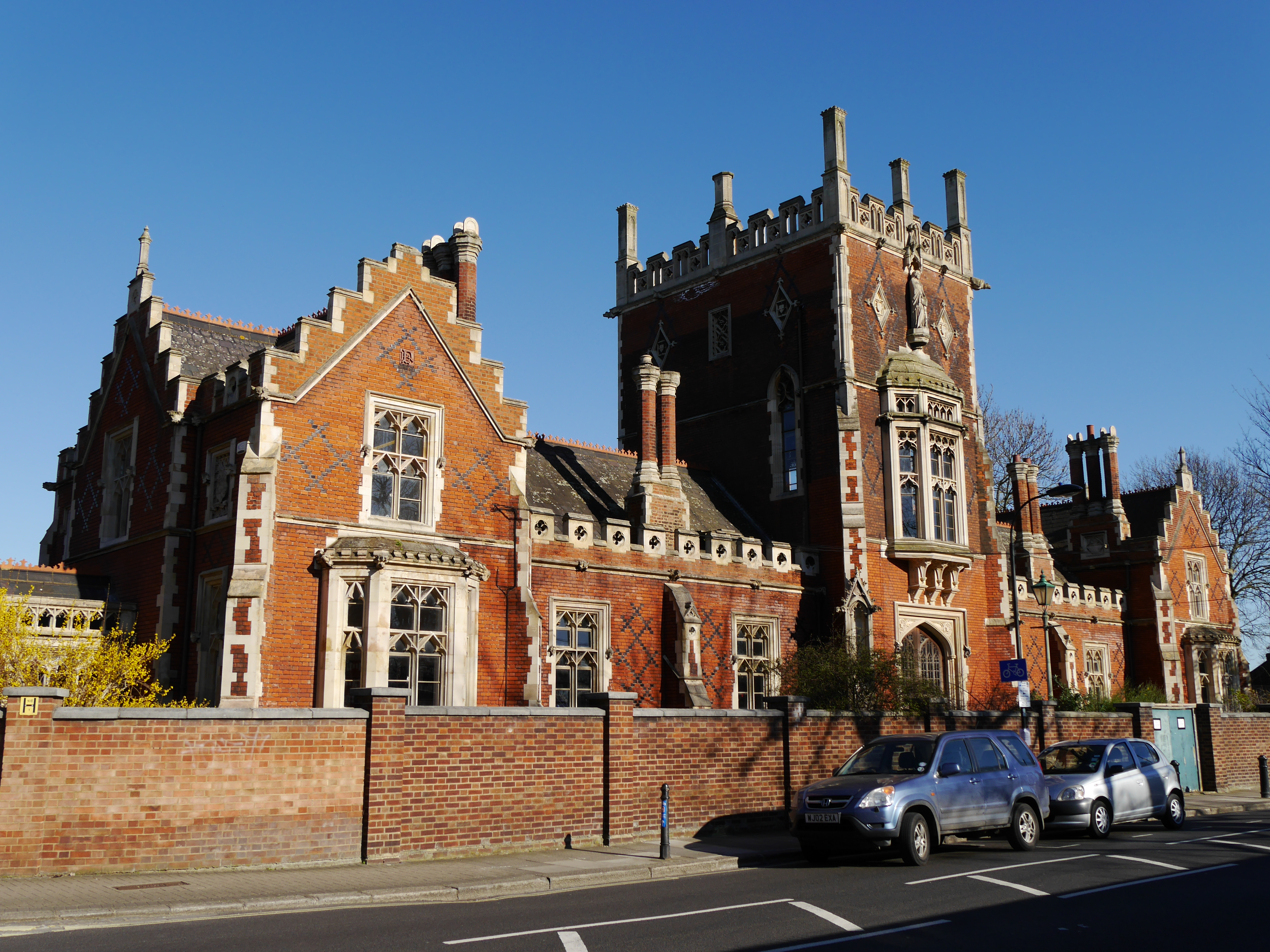
The Castle Club

The Castle Club is a Grade II listed former school at Broomhouse Lane, Fulham, London.

It was built in 1855 in the Gothic Revival style, and the architect was Horace Francis.

It was formerly the Eight Feathers Club, and was originally a school.

It was built as the "Elizabethan Ragged School" and paid for by Laurence Sulivan, the grandson of Laurence Sulivan MP, chairman of the East India Company. It was named in honour of Sulivan's wife Elizabeth, the younger sister of the Prime Minister Lord Palmerston. It later became a school for tubercular children run by the LCC and then a youth club.
