= Maintaining power =

Device for keeping a mechanical clock working while it is being wound

In horology, a maintaining power is a mechanism for keeping a clock or watch going while it is being wound.

== Huygens ==
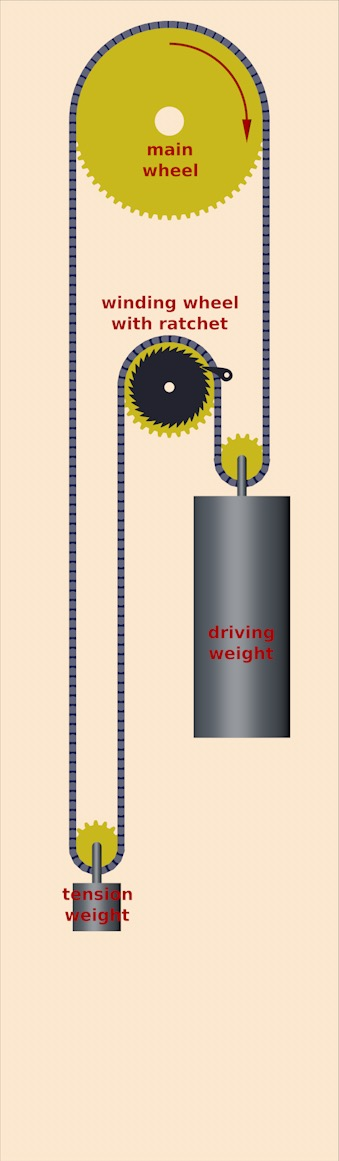
Wound state

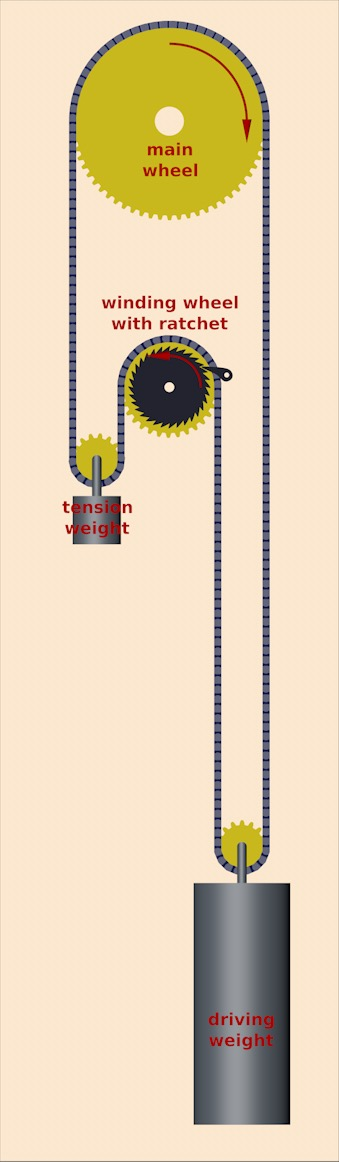
Unwound state

Huygens's mechanism

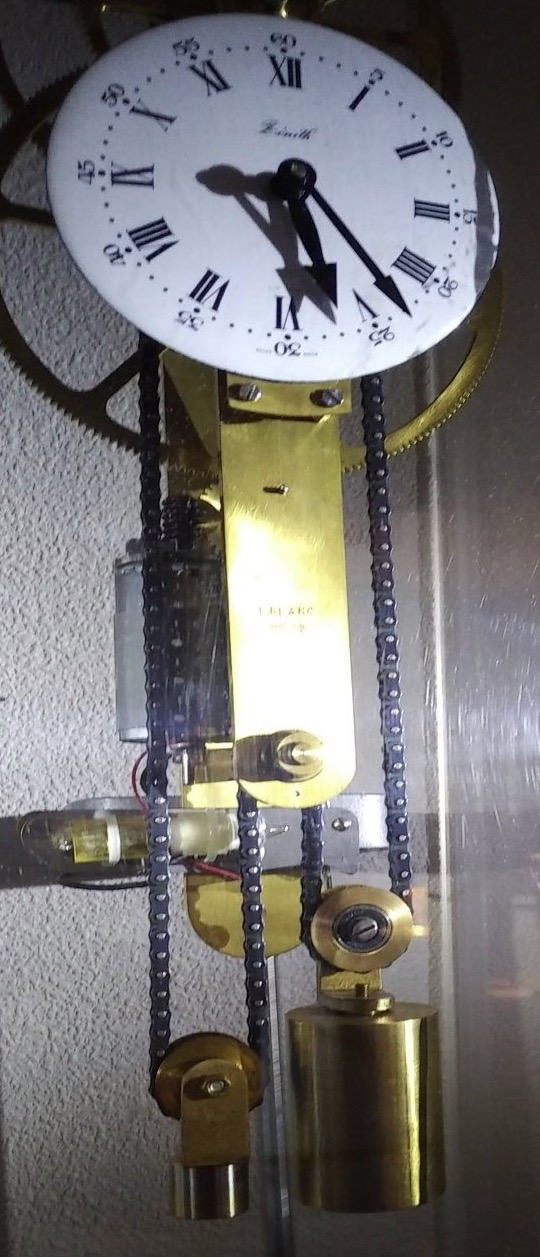
Huygens' maintaining power in use

The weight drive used by Christiaan Huygens in his early clocks acts as a maintaining power. In this layout, the weight which drives the clock is carried on a pulley and the cord (or chain) supporting the weight is wrapped around the main driving wheel on one side and the rewinding wheel on the other. The chain then loops down from the rewinding wheel and up again to the main driving wheel via a second pulley carrying a small tensioning weight which ensures the loop stays taut and the chain engages well with the main driving wheel and rewinding wheel. In the first illustration the clock is fully wound, the driving weight is up and the tensioning weight down, a ratchet on the winding wheel prevents it from turning back. The driving weight pulls the main wheel in the direction of the arrow. In the second illustration the driving weight has reached its lowest point and the tensioning weight is now up, the clock needs to be wound by turning the winding wheel (or by pulling the chain), but during that time the main wheel continues to feel the driving force and the clock will not stop.

The principle was later applied by the French clockmaker Robert Robin who automated the re-winding in his remontoire. The drive- and tensioning-weights were made much smaller and drove the escape wheel directly. It was re-wound by the main train of the clock which turned the fourth pulley and was controlled by a lever attached to the tensioning weight. When this had risen to its upper limit, it started the re-winding process. As the drive weight rose, the tensioning weight fell and at the bottom of its travel it stopped the re-winding.

== Bolt and shutter ==
This is a type of maintaining power which needs to be engaged before re-winding is started. It consists of a weighted arm (bolt) with a ratchet pawl on the end of it which engages with the edge of the first wheel to keep it turning while the weight or spring is wound. To make sure that it was always operated, the hole in the dial through which the clock is wound is covered with a shutter which can be moved out of the way by pushing down on a lever at the side of the dial. This lever also engages the bolt. A similar type of mechanism is sometimes used on turret clocks. Because these take much longer to wind, and are usually wound by trained staff, the bolt carries a segment of a gear wheel rather than a single pawl and is engaged manually.

== Harrison ==
John Harrison invented a form of maintaining power around the mid-1720s. His clocks of the period used a grasshopper escapement which malfunctioned if not driven continuously—even while the clock was being wound. In essence, the maintaining power consists of a disc between the driving drum of the clock and the great wheel. The drum drives the disc, and a spring attached to the disc drives the great wheel. The spring is selected to be slightly weaker than the driving drum, so in normal operation it is fully compressed.

When the pressure from the drum is removed for winding, the ratchet teeth on the edge of the disc engage a pawl and prevent it turning backward. The spring continues to drive the great wheel forward with a force slightly less than normal. When winding is done, the drum drives the disc forward, re-compressing the maintaining spring ready for its next use. The whole mechanism is completely automatic in its operation and has remained one of Harrison's lasting contributions to horology.
