= Marine chronometer =

Clock used on ships to aid in navigation

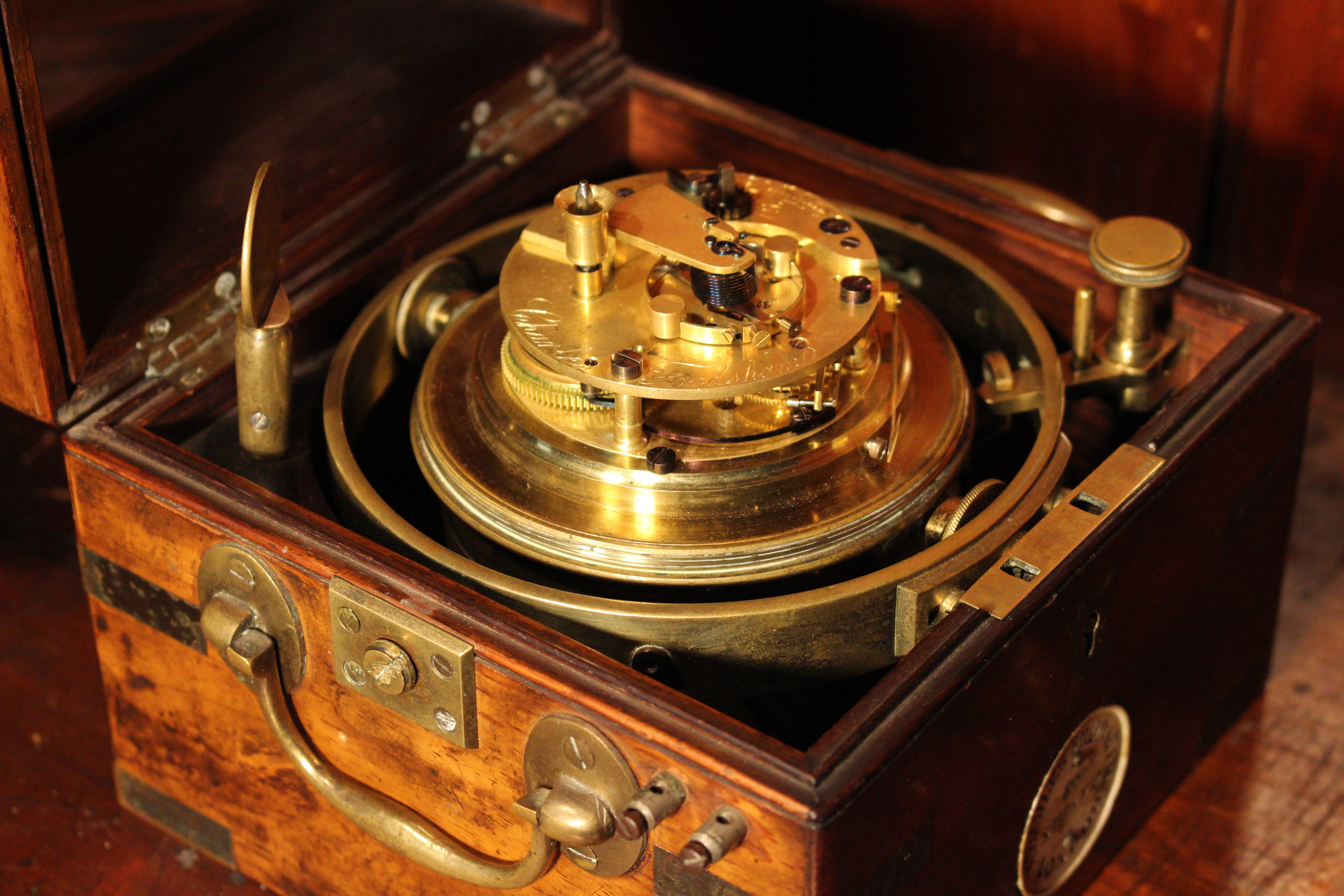
- A marine chronometer by Charles Frodsham of London, shown turned upside down to reveal the movement. Chronometer circa 1844–1860.
- Classification: Clock
- Industry: Transportation
- Application: Timekeeping
- Powered: No
- Inventor: John Harrison
- Invented: 1761

A marine chronometer is a precision timepiece that is carried on a ship and employed in the determination of the ship's position by celestial navigation. It is used to determine longitude by comparing Greenwich Mean Time (GMT) and the time at the current location found from observations of celestial bodies. When first developed in the 18th century, it was a major technical achievement, as accurate knowledge of the time over a long sea voyage was vital for effective navigation, lacking electronic or communications aids. The first true chronometer was the life work of one man, John Harrison, spanning 31 years of persistent experimentation and testing that revolutionized naval (and later aerial) navigation.

The term chronometer was coined from the Greek words χρόνος (chronos, "time") and meter (meaning measure). The 1713 book Physico-Theology by the English cleric and scientist William Derham includes one of the earliest theoretical descriptions of a marine chronometer. It has recently become more commonly used to describe watches tested and certified to meet certain precision standards.

== History ==
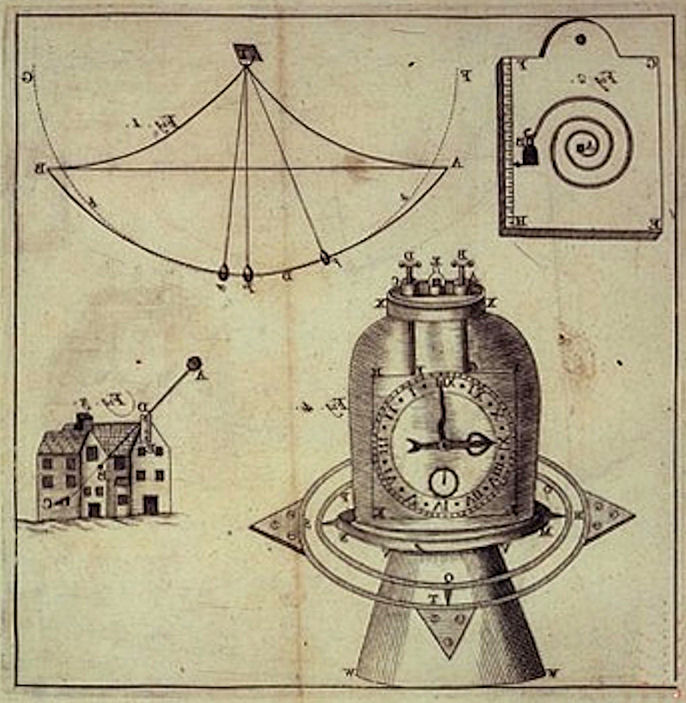
The marine "Chronometer" of Jeremy Thacker used gimbals and a vacuum in a bell jar.

To determine a position on the Earth's surface, using classical models, it is necessary and sufficient to know the latitude, longitude, and altitude. Altitude considerations can naturally be ignored for vessels operating at sea level. Until the mid-1750s, accurate navigation at sea out of sight of land was an unsolved problem due to the difficulty in calculating longitude. Navigators could determine their latitude by measuring the sun's angle at noon (i.e., when it reached its highest point in the sky, or culmination) or, in the Northern Hemisphere, by measuring the angle of Polaris (the North Star) from the horizon (usually during twilight). To find their longitude, however, they needed a time standard that would work aboard a ship. Observation of regular celestial motions, such as Galileo's method based on observing Jupiter's natural satellites, was usually not possible at sea due to the ship's motion. The lunar distances method, initially proposed by Johannes Werner in 1514, was developed in parallel with the marine chronometer. The Dutch scientist Gemma Frisius was the first to propose the use of a chronometer to determine longitude in 1530.

The purpose of a chronometer is to measure accurately the time of a known fixed location. This is particularly important for navigation. As the Earth rotates at a regular predictable rate, the time difference between the chronometer and the ship's local time can be used to calculate the longitude of the ship relative to the Prime Meridian (defined as 0°) (or another starting point) if accurately enough known, using spherical trigonometry. Practical celestial navigation usually requires a marine chronometer to measure time, a sextant to measure the angles, an almanac giving schedules of the coordinates of celestial objects, a set of sight reduction tables to help perform the height and azimuth computations, and a chart of the region. With sight reduction tables, the only calculations required are addition and subtraction. Most people can master simpler celestial navigation procedures after a day or two of instruction and practice, even using manual calculation methods. The use of a marine chronometer to determine longitude by chronometer permits navigators to obtain a reasonably accurate position fix. For every four seconds that the time source is in error, the east–west position may be off by up to just over one nautical mile as the angular speed of Earth is latitude-dependent.

The creation of a timepiece which would work reliably at sea was difficult. Until the 20th century, the best timekeepers were pendulum clocks, but both the rolling of a ship at sea and the up to 0.2% variations in the gravity of Earth made a simple gravity-based pendulum useless both in theory and in practice.

=== First examples ===
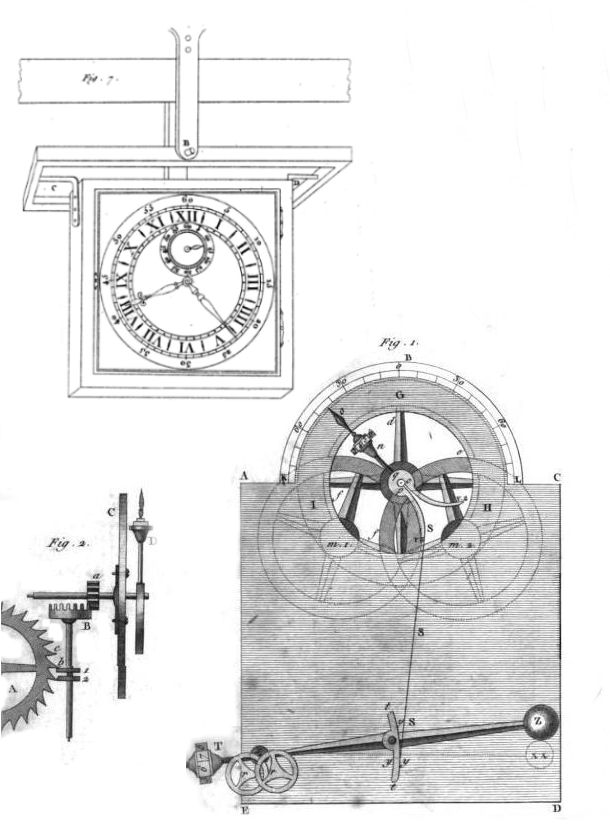
Henry Sully (1680–1729) presented a first marine chronometer in 1716

Christiaan Huygens, following his invention of the pendulum clock in 1656, made the first attempt at a marine chronometer in 1673 in France, under the sponsorship of Jean-Baptiste Colbert. In 1675, Huygens, who was receiving a pension from Louis XIV, invented a chronometer that employed a balance wheel and a spiral spring for regulation, instead of a pendulum, opening the way to marine chronometers and modern pocket watches and wristwatches. He obtained a patent for his invention from Colbert, but his clock remained imprecise at sea. Huygens' attempt in 1675 to obtain an English patent from Charles II stimulated Robert Hooke, who claimed to have conceived of a spring-driven clock years earlier, to attempt to produce one and patent it. During 1675 Huygens and Hooke each delivered two such devices to Charles, but none worked well and neither Huygens nor Hooke received an English patent. It was during this work that Hooke formulated Hooke's law.

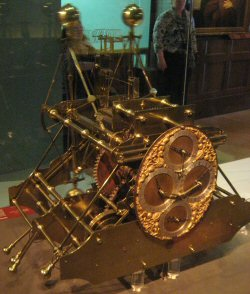
John Harrison's H1 marine chronometer of 1735

The first published use of the term chronometer was in 1684 in Arcanum Navarchicum, a theoretical work by Kiel professor Matthias Wasmuth. This was followed by a further theoretical description of a chronometer in works published by English scientist William Derham in 1713. Derham's principal work, Physico-theology, or a demonstration of the being and attributes of God from his works of creation, also proposed the use of vacuum sealing to ensure greater accuracy in the operation of clocks. Attempts to construct a working marine chronometer were begun by Jeremy Thacker in England in 1714, and by Henry Sully in France two years later. Sully published his work in 1726 with Une Horloge inventée et executée par M. Sulli, but neither his nor Thacker's models were able to resist the rolling of the seas and keep precise time while in shipboard conditions.

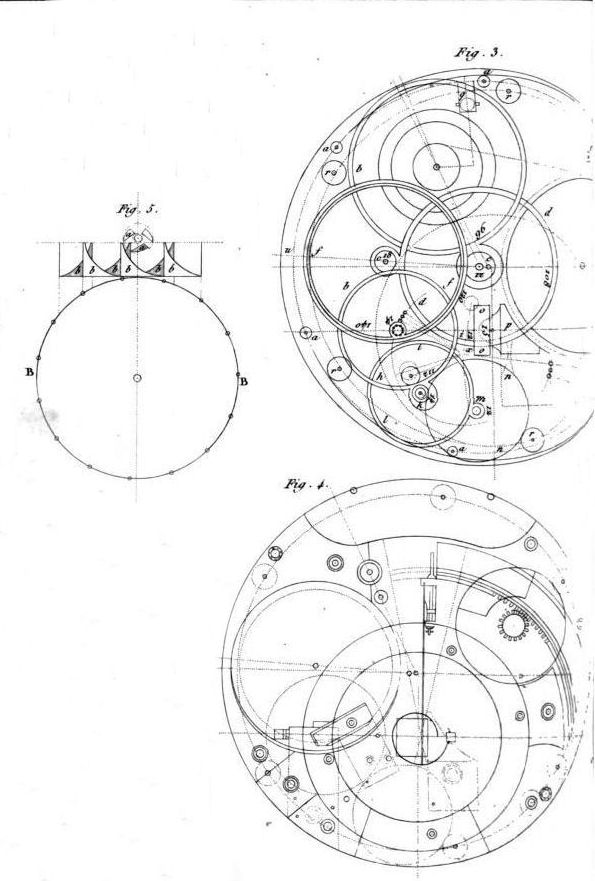
Drawings of Harrison's H4 chronometer of 1761, published in The principles of Mr Harrison's time-keeper, 1767

In 1714, the British government offered a longitude prize for a method of determining longitude at sea, with the awards ranging from £10,000 to £20,000 (£2 million to £4 million in 2026 terms) depending on accuracy. John Harrison, a Yorkshire carpenter, submitted a project in 1730, and in 1735 completed a clock based on a pair of counter-oscillating weighted beams connected by springs whose motion was not influenced by gravity or the motion of a ship. His first two sea timepieces H1 and H2 (completed in 1741) used this system, but he realised that they had a fundamental sensitivity to centrifugal force, which meant that they could never be accurate enough at sea. Construction of his third machine, designated H3, in 1759 included novel circular balances and the invention of the bi-metallic strip and caged roller bearings, inventions which are still widely used. However, H3's circular balances still proved too inaccurate and he eventually abandoned the large machines.

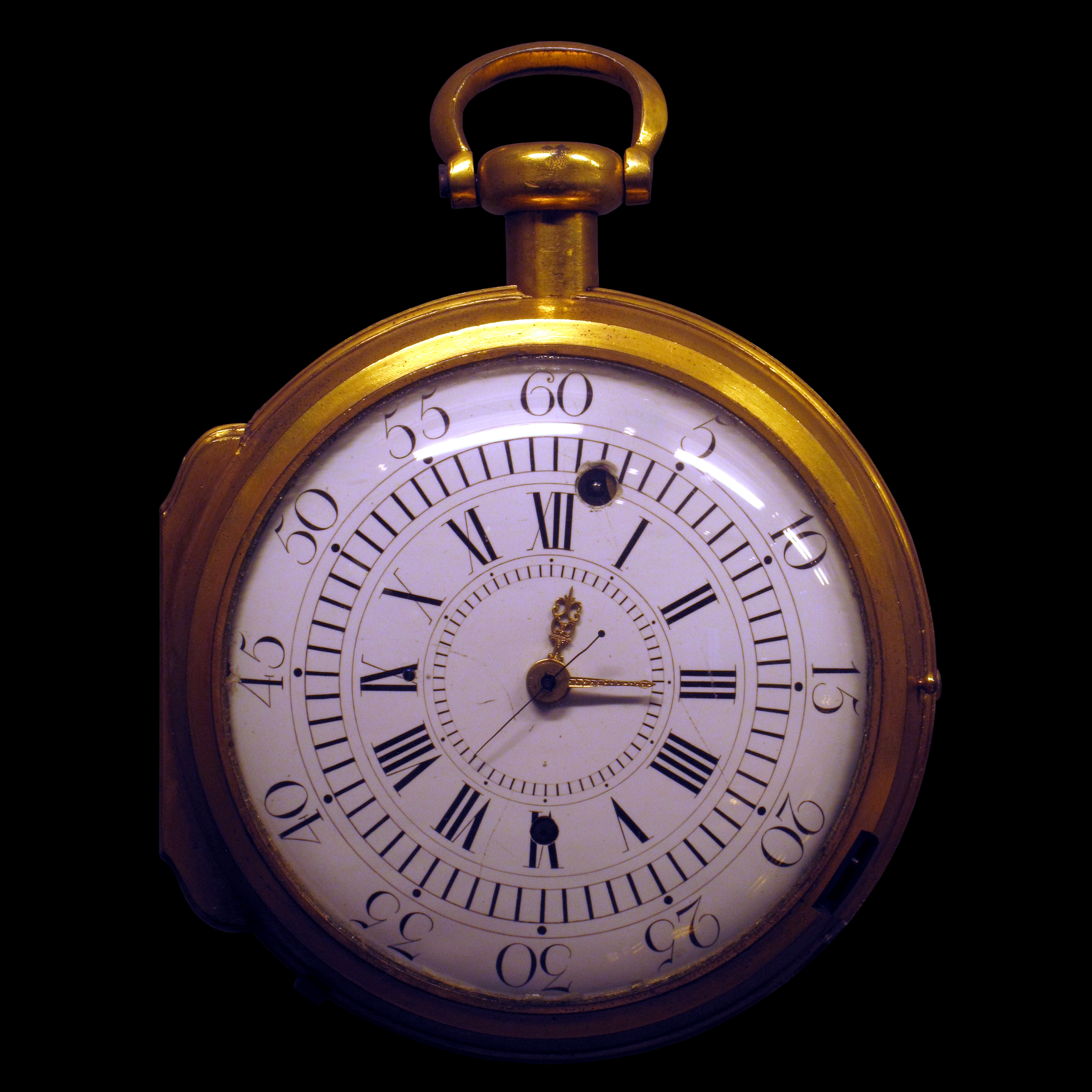
Ferdinand Berthoud's marine chronometer no. 3, 1763

Harrison solved the precision problems with his much smaller H4 chronometer design in 1761. H4 looked much like a large five-inch (12 cm) diameter pocket watch. In 1761, Harrison submitted H4 for the £20,000 longitude prize. His design used a fast-beating balance wheel controlled by a temperature-compensated spiral spring. These features remained in use until stable electronic oscillators allowed very accurate portable timepieces to be made at affordable cost. In 1767, the Board of Longitude published a description of his work in The Principles of Mr. Harrison's time-keeper. A French expedition under Charles-François-César Le Tellier de Montmirail performed the first measurement of longitude using marine chronometers aboard Aurore in 1767.

=== Further development ===
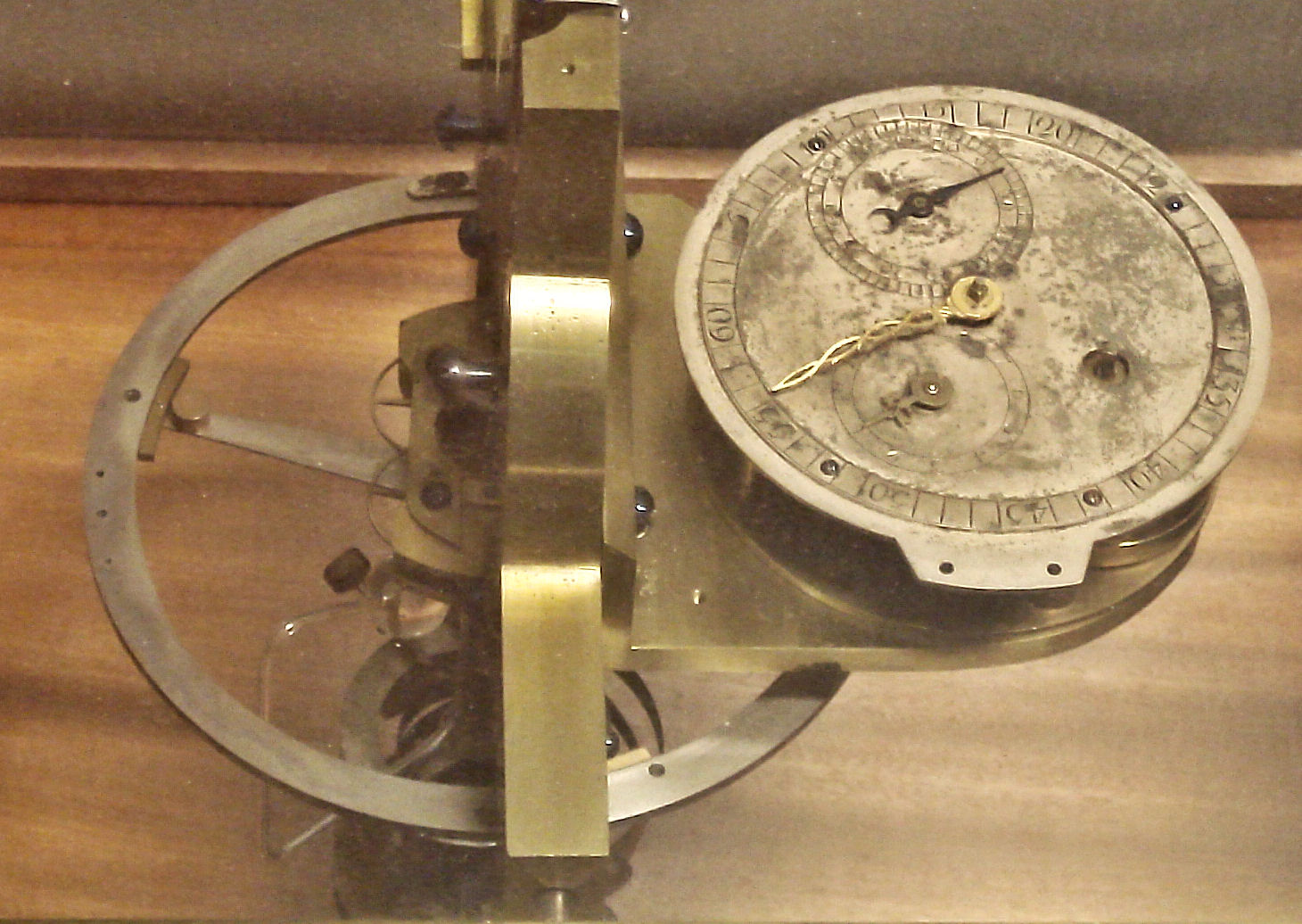
Pierre Le Roy marine chronometer, 1766, photographed at the Musée des Arts et Métiers in Paris

In France, 1748, Pierre Le Roy invented the detent escapement characteristic of modern chronometers. In 1766, he created a revolutionary chronometer that incorporated a detent escapement, the temperature-compensated balance and the isochronous balance spring: Harrison showed the possibility of having a reliable chronometer at sea, but these developments by Le Roy are considered by Rupert Gould to be the foundation of the modern chronometer. Le Roy's innovations made the chronometer a much more accurate piece than had been anticipated.

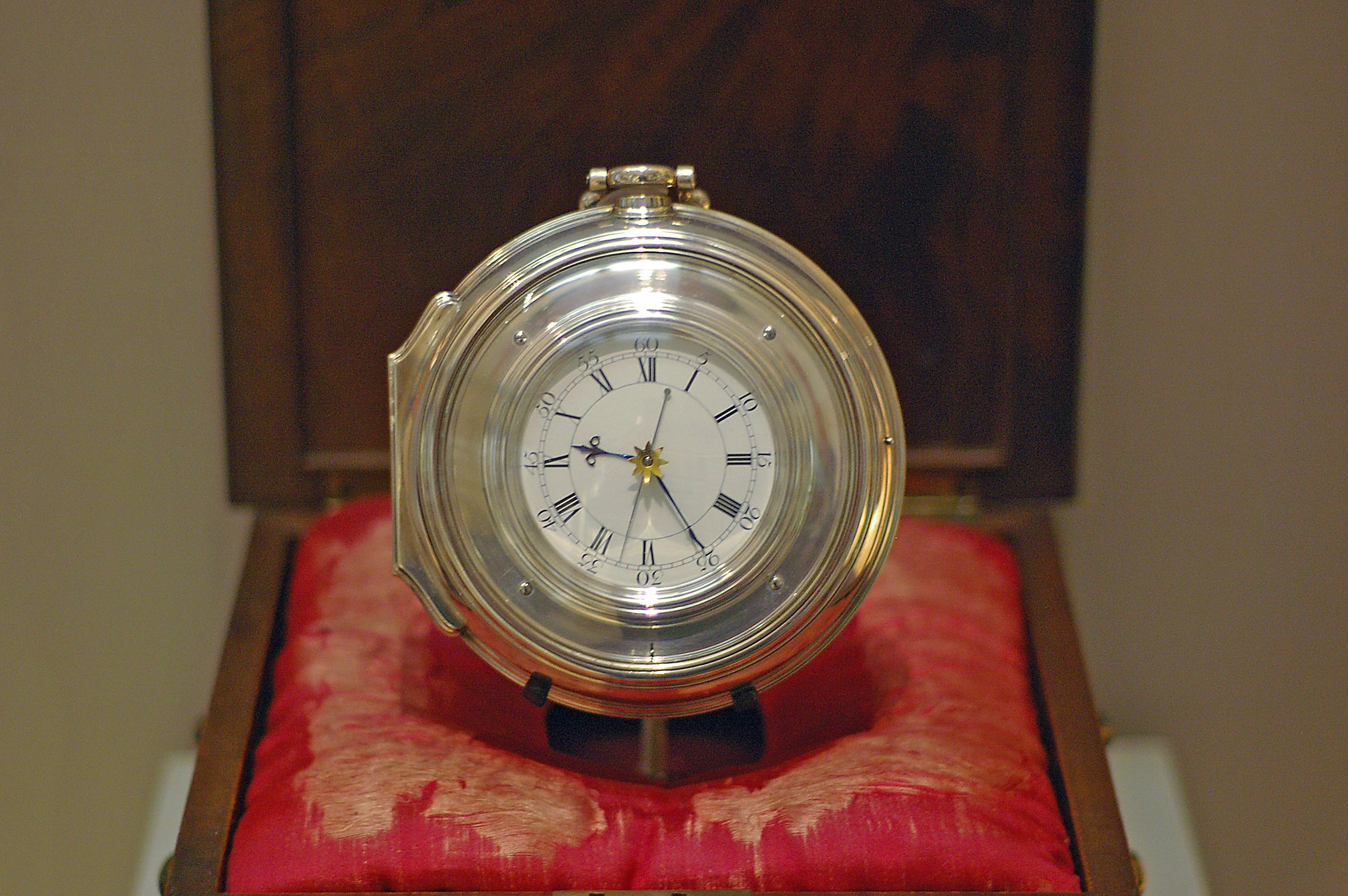
Harrison's Chronometer H5 of 1772, now on display at the Science Museum, London

Ferdinand Berthoud in France, as well as Thomas Mudge in Britain also successfully produced marine timekeepers. Although none were simple, they proved that Harrison's design was not the only answer to the problem. The greatest strides toward practicality came at the hands of Thomas Earnshaw and John Arnold, who in 1780 developed and patented simplified, detached, "spring detent" escapements, moved the temperature compensation to the balance, and improved the design and manufacturing of balance springs. This combination of innovations served as the basis of marine chronometers until the electronic era.

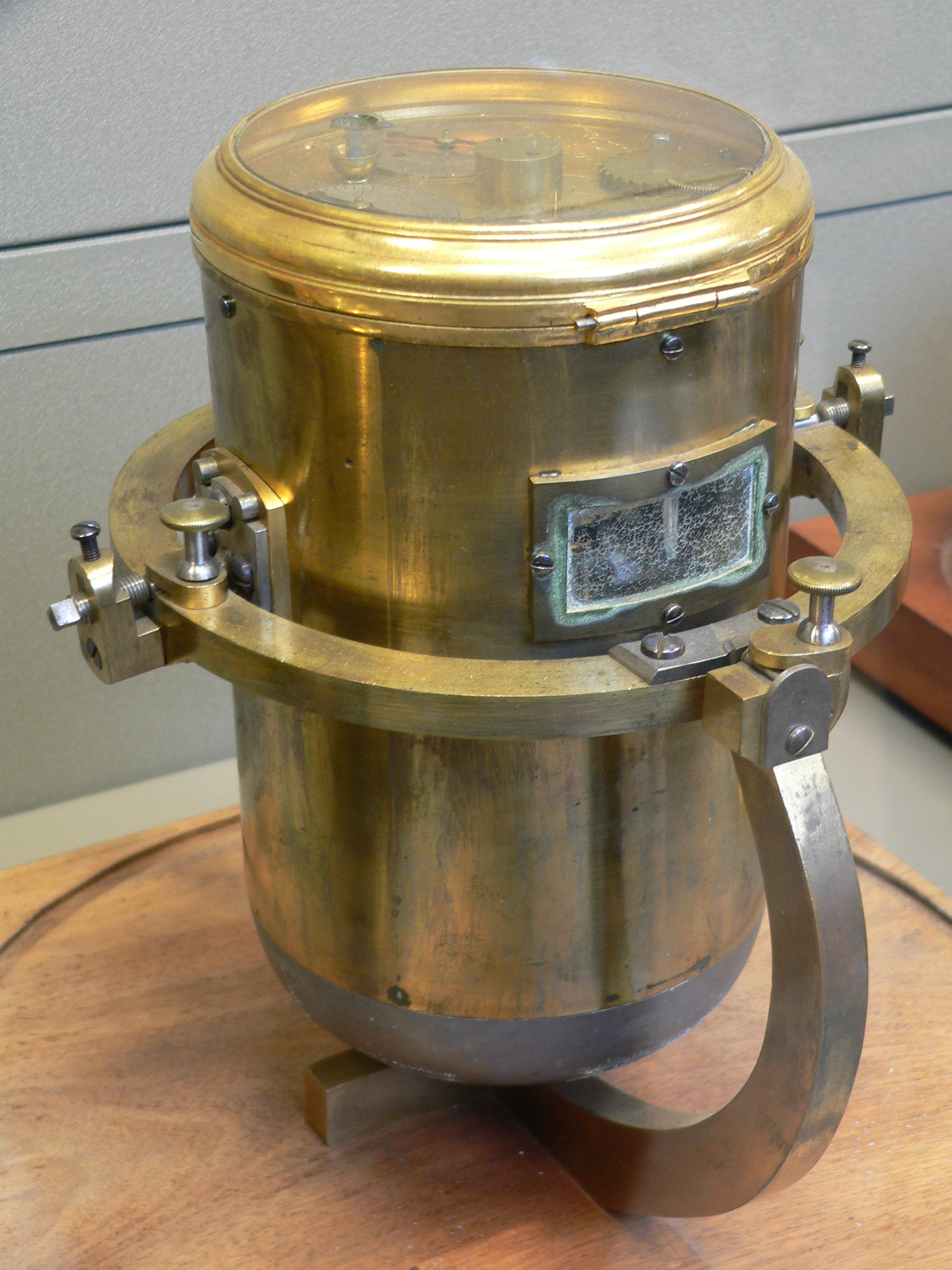
Ferdinand Berthoud chronometer no. 24 (1782), on display at the Musée des Arts et Métiers, Paris

The new technology was initially so expensive that not all ships carried chronometers, as illustrated by the fateful last journey of the East Indiaman Arniston, shipwrecked with the loss of 372 lives. However, by 1825, the Royal Navy had begun routinely supplying its vessels with chronometers.

Beginning in 1820, the British Royal Observatory in Greenwich tested marine chronometers in an Admiralty-instigated trial or "chronometer competition" program intended to encourage the improvement of chronometers. In 1840 a new series of trials in a different format was begun by the seventh Astronomer Royal George Biddell Airy. These trials continued in much the same format until the outbreak of World War I in 1914, at which point they were suspended. Although the formal trials ceased, the testing of chronometers for the Royal Navy did not.

Marine chronometer makers looked to a phalanx of astronomical observatories located in Western Europe to conduct accuracy assessments of their timepieces. Once mechanical timepiece movements developed sufficient precision to allow for adequately accurate marine navigation, these third party independent assessments also developed into what became known as "chronometer competitions" at the astronomical observatories located in Western Europe. The Neuchâtel Observatory, Geneva Observatory, Besançon Observatory, Kew Observatory, German Naval Observatory Hamburg and Glashütte Observatory are prominent examples of observatories that certified the accuracy of mechanical timepieces. The observatory testing regime typically lasted for 30 to 50 days and contained accuracy standards that were far more stringent and difficult than modern standards such as those set by the Contrôle Officiel Suisse des Chronomètres (COSC). When a movement passed the observatory test, it became certified as an observatory chronometer and received a Bulletin de Marche from the observatory, stipulating the performance of the movement.

It was common for ships at the time to observe a time ball, such as the one at the Royal Observatory, Greenwich, to check their chronometers before departing on a long voyage. Every day, ships would anchor briefly in the River Thames at Greenwich, waiting for the ball at the observatory to drop at precisely 1pm. This practice was in small part responsible for the subsequent adoption of Greenwich Mean Time as an international standard. (Time balls became redundant around 1920 with the introduction of radio time signals, which have themselves largely been superseded by GPS time.) In addition to setting their time before departing on a voyage, ship chronometers were also routinely checked for accuracy while at sea by carrying out lunar or solar observations. In typical use, the chronometer would be mounted in a sheltered location below decks to avoid damage and exposure to the elements. Mariners would use the chronometer to set a so-called hack watch, which would be carried on deck to make the astronomical observations. Though much less accurate (and less expensive) than the chronometer, the hack watch would be satisfactory for a short period of time after setting it (i.e., long enough to make the observations).

Laid out view of the Wempe Marine Chronometer used in WWII by Kriegsmarine

=== Rationalizing production methods ===
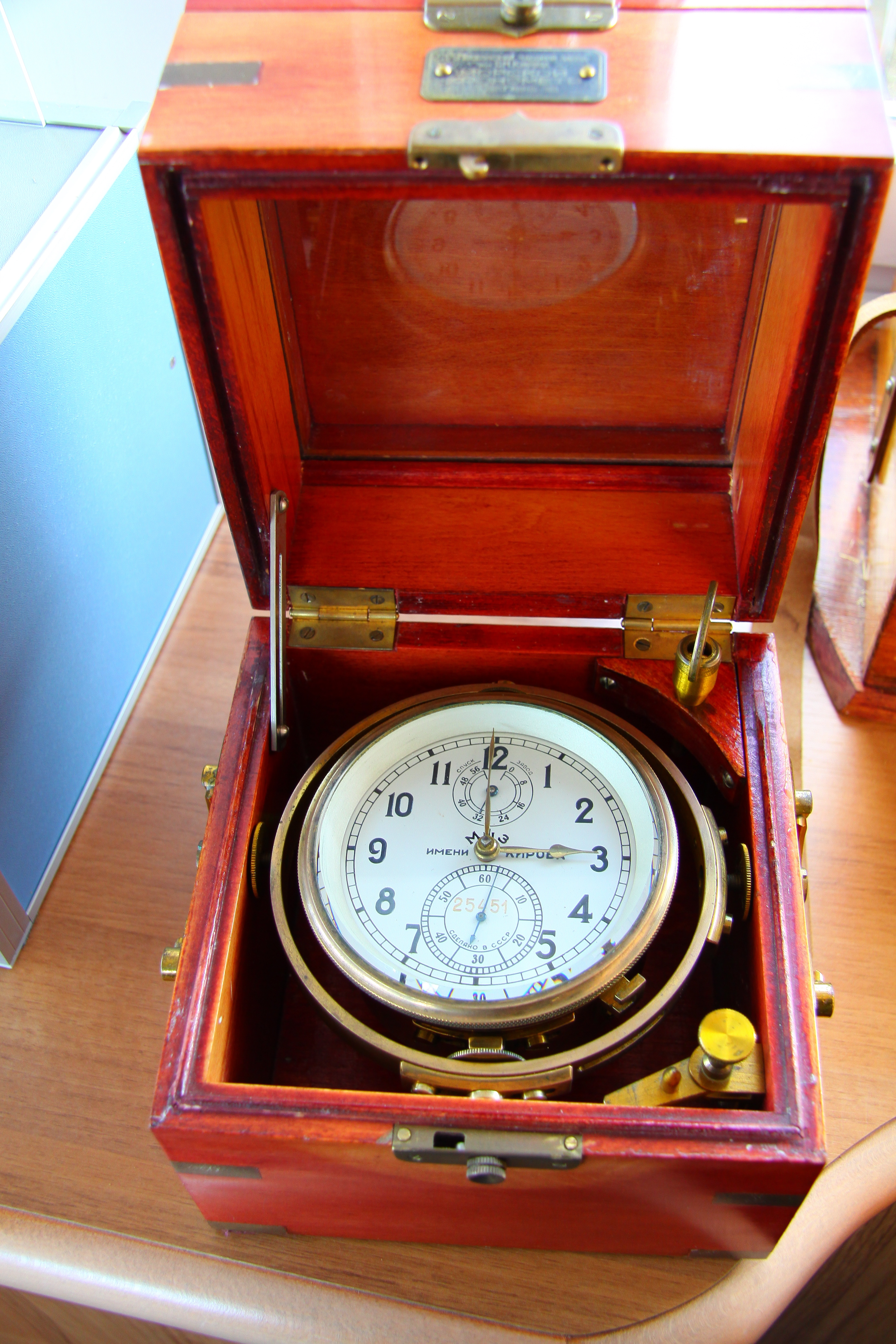
Einheitschronometer pattern MX6 marine chronometer, mass-produced in the Soviet Union after World War II

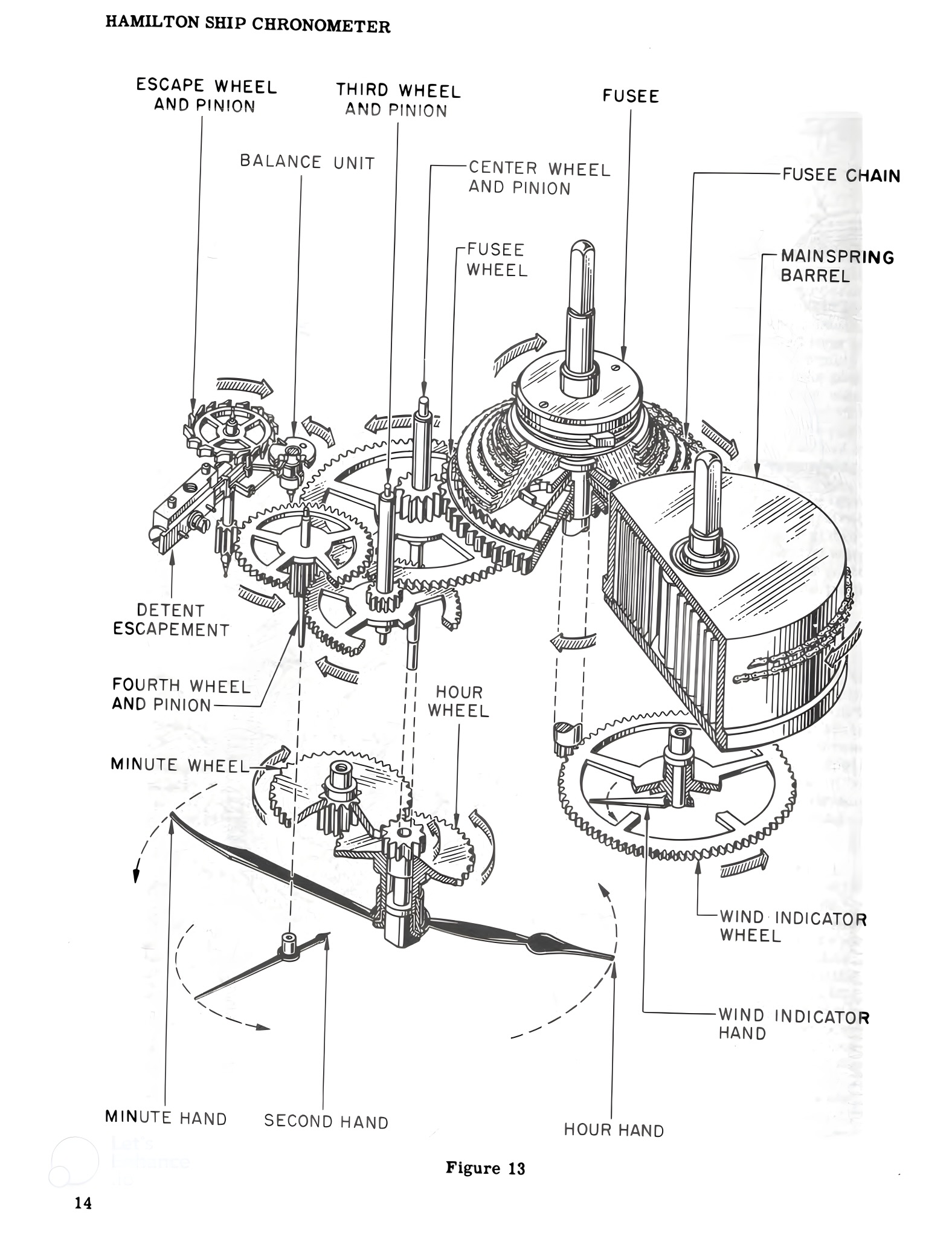
Inner working of the Hamilton Model 21 marine chronometer, mass-produced in the United States during and after World War II

An animation of the movement of the Marine Chronometer

Although industrial production methods began revolutionizing watchmaking in the middle of the 19th century, chronometer manufacture remained craft-based much longer and was dominated by British and Swiss manufacturers. Around the turn of the 20th century, Swiss makers such as Ulysse Nardin made great strides toward incorporating modern production methods and using fully interchangeable parts, but it was only with the onset of World War II that the Hamilton Watch Company in the United States perfected the process of mass production, which enabled it to produce thousands of its Hamilton Model 21 and Model 22 chronometers from 1942 onwards for the branches of the United States military and merchant marine as well as other Allied forces during World War II. The Hamilton 21 Marine Chronometer had a chain drive fusee and its second hand advanced in 1/2-second increments over a 60 seconds marked sub dial. In Germany, where marine chronometers were imported or used foreign key components, a Drei-Pfeiler Werk Einheitschronometer (three-pillar movement unified chronometer) was developed by a collaboration between the Wempe Chronometerwerke and A. Lange & Söhne companies to make more efficient production possible. The development of a precise and inexpensive Einheitschronometer was a 1939 German naval command and Aviation ministry driven initiative. Serial production began in 1942. All parts were made in Germany and interchangeable. During the course of World War II modifications that became necessary when raw materials became scarce were applied and work was compulsory and sometimes voluntarily shared between various German manufacturers to speed up production. The production of German unified design chronometers with their harmonized components continued until long after World War II in Germany and the Soviet Union, who confiscated the original Einheitschronometer technical drawings, and set up a production line in Moscow in 1949 that produced the first Soviet MX6 chronometers containing German made movements. From 1952 onwards until 1997 MX6 chronometers with minor НИИ ЧАСПРОМ (NII Chasprom — Horological institute of the Soviet era) devised alterations were produced from components all made in the Soviet Union. The German Einheitschronometer ultimately became the mechanical marine timekeeper design produced in the highest volume, with about 58,000 units produced. Of these, less than 3,000 were produced during World War II, about 5,000 after the war in West and East Germany and about 50,000 in the Soviet Union and later post-Soviet Russia. Of the Hamilton 21 Marine Chronometer during and after World War II about 13,000 units were produced. Despite the Einheitschronometer and Hamilton's success, chronometers made in the old way never disappeared from the marketplace during the era of mechanical timekeepers. Thomas Mercer Chronometers was among the companies that continued to make them.

=== Historical significance ===
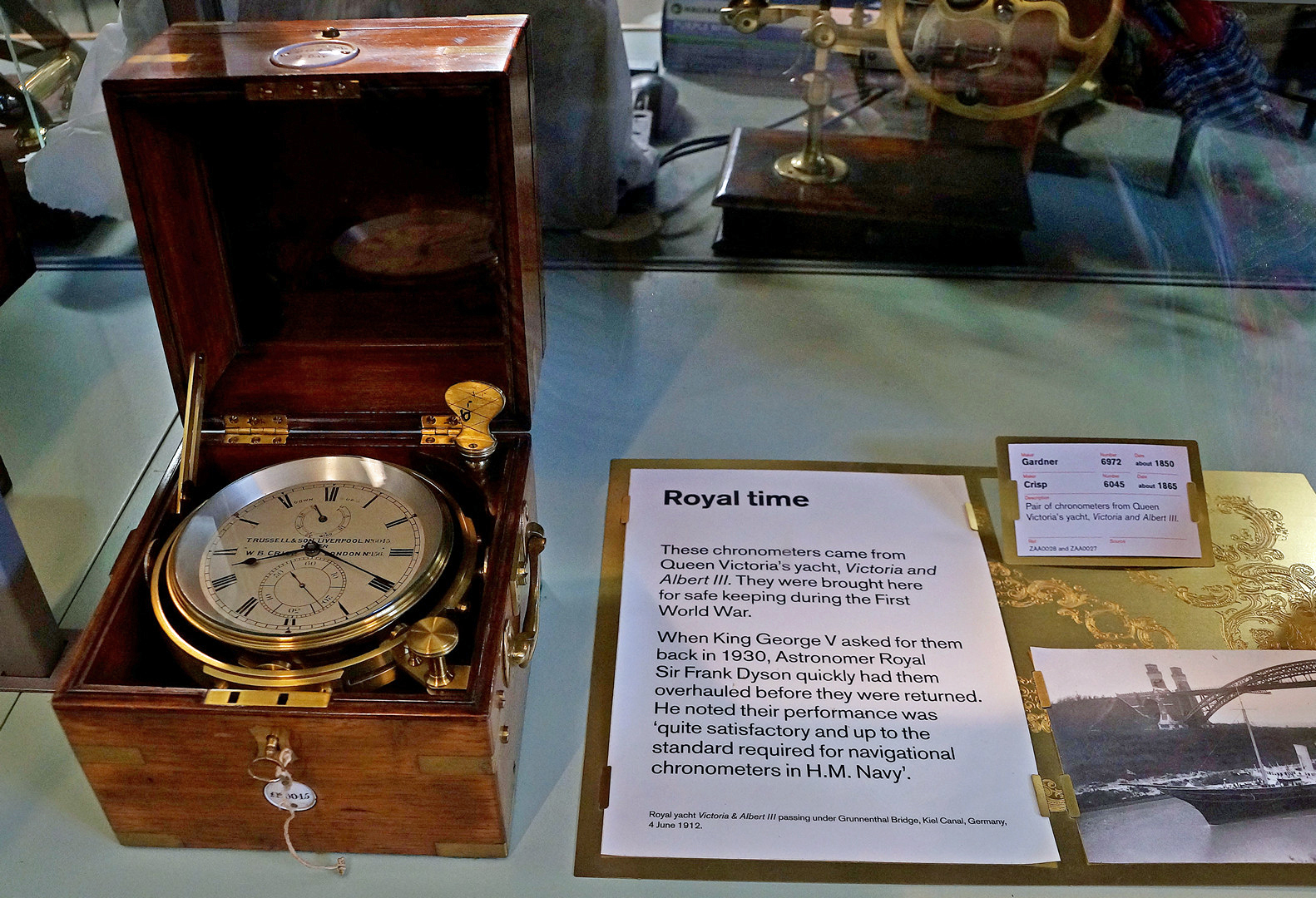
Mechanical boxed Marine Chronometer used on Queen Victoria's royal yacht HMY Victoria and Albert, made about 1865

Ship's marine chronometers were the most exact portable mechanical timepieces ever produced and in a static environment were only trumped by non-portable precision pendulum clocks for observatories. They served, alongside the sextant, to determine the location of ships at sea. The seafaring nations invested richly in the development of these precision instruments, as pinpointing location at sea gave a decisive naval advantage. Without their accuracy and the accuracy of the feats of navigation that marine chronometers enabled, it is arguable that the ascendancy of the Royal Navy, and by extension that of the British Empire, might not have occurred so overwhelmingly; the formation of the empire by wars and conquests of colonies abroad took place in a period in which British vessels had reliable navigation due to the chronometer, while their Portuguese, Dutch, and French opponents did not. For example: the French were well established in India and other places before Britain, but were defeated by naval forces in the Seven Years' War.

Rating and maintaining marine chronometers was deemed important well into the 20th century, as after World War I the work of the British Royal Observatory's Chronometer Department became largely confined to rating of chronometers and watches that the Admiralty already owned and providing acceptance testing. In 1937 a workshop was set up for the first time by the Time Department for the repair and adjustment of British armed forces issued chronometers and watches. These maintenance activities had previously been outsourced to commercial workshops.

From about the 1960s onwards mechanical spring detent marine chronometers were gradually replaced and supplanted by chronometers based on electric engineering techniques and technologies. In 1985 the British Ministry of Defence invited bids by tender for the disposal of their mechanical Hamilton Model 21 Marine Chronometers. The US Navy kept their Hamilton Model 21 Marine Chronometers in service as backups to the Loran-C hyperbolic radio navigation system until 1988, when the GPS global navigation satellite system was approved as reliable. At the end of the 20th century the production of mechanical marine chronometers had declined to the point where only a few were being made to special order by the First Moscow Watch Factory 'Kirov' (Poljot) in Russia, Wempe in Germany and Mercer in England.

The most complete international collection of marine chronometers, including Harrison's H1 to H4, is at the Royal Observatory, Greenwich, in London, UK.

== Characteristics ==
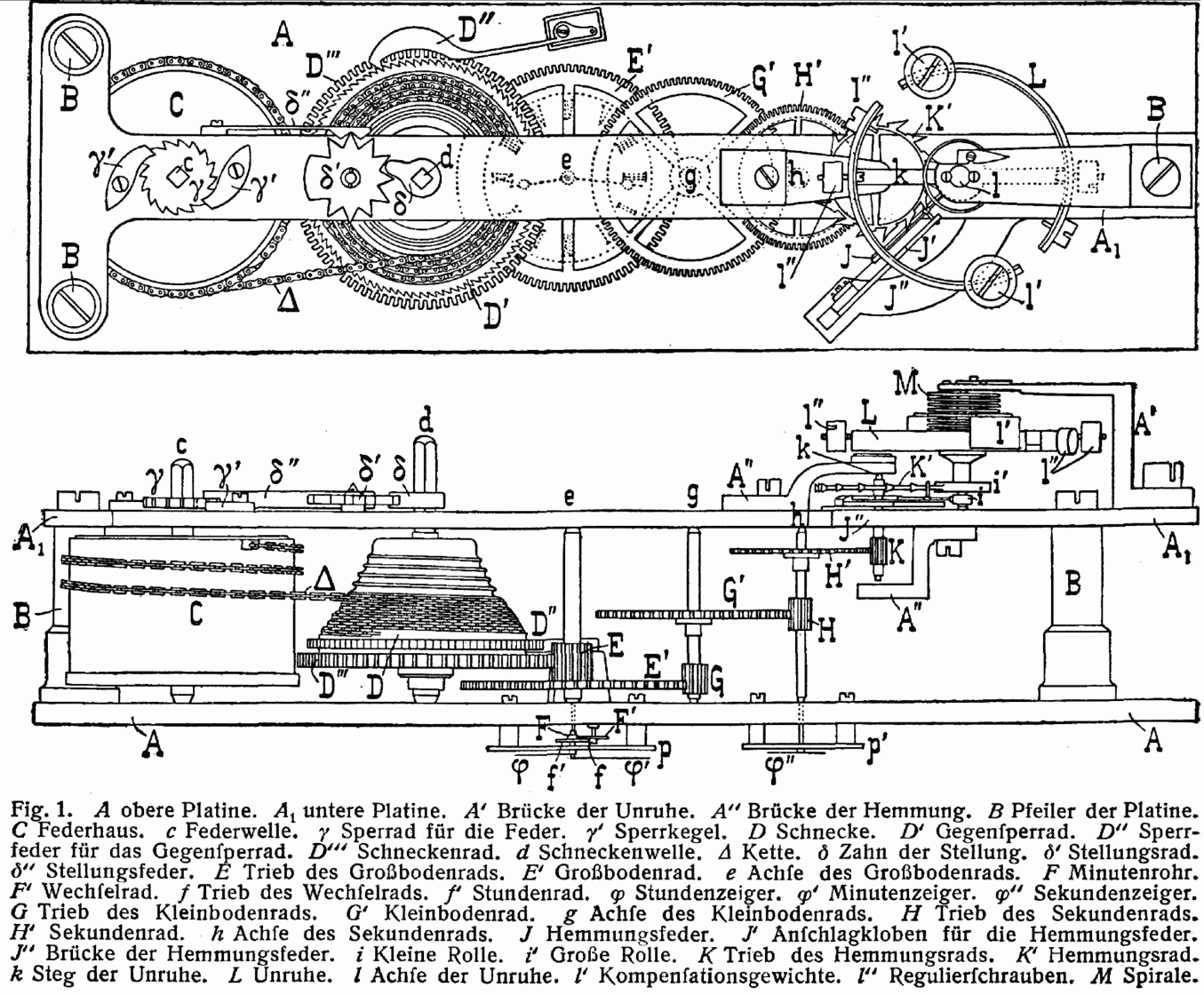
A chronometer mechanism diagrammed (text is in German). Note fusee to transform varying spring tension to a constant force.

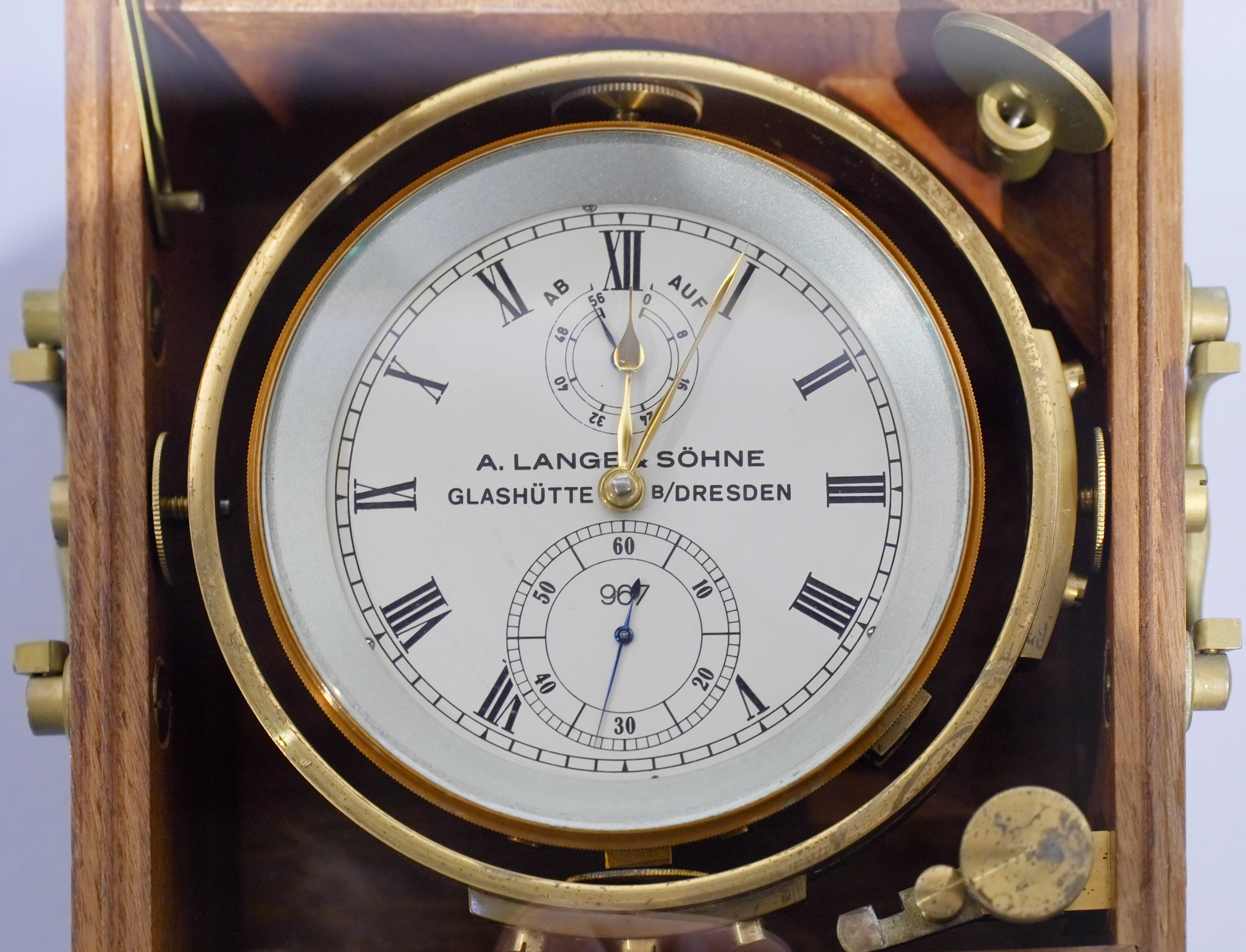
Einheitschronometer pattern marine chronometer (A. Lange & Söhne, 1948) displaying its second hand advancing in 1/2-second increments over a sub-dial marked with 60 seconds, for optimal timing of measurements of angles of celestial objects, at the GFZ Helmholtz Centre for Geosciences

The crucial problem was to find a resonator that remained unaffected by the changing conditions met by a ship at sea. The balance wheel, harnessed to a spring, solved most of the problems associated with the ship's motion. Unfortunately, the elasticity of most balance spring materials changes relative to temperature. To compensate for ever-changing spring strength, the majority of chronometer balances used bi-metallic strips to move small weights toward and away from the centre of oscillation, thus altering the period of the balance to match the changing force of the spring. The balance spring problem was solved with a nickel-steel alloy named Elinvar for its invariable elasticity at normal temperatures. The inventor was Charles Édouard Guillaume, who won the 1920 Nobel Prize for physics in recognition for his metallurgical work.

The escapement serves two purposes. First, it allows the train to advance fractionally and record the balance's oscillations. At the same time, it supplies minute amounts of energy to counter tiny losses from friction, thus maintaining the momentum of the oscillating balance. The escapement is the part that ticks. Since the natural resonance of an oscillating balance serves as the heart of a chronometer, chronometer escapements are designed to interfere with the balance as little as possible. There are many constant-force and detached escapement designs, but the most common are the spring detent and pivoted detent. In both of these, a small detent locks the escape wheel and allows the balance to swing completely free of interference except for a brief moment at the centre of oscillation, when it is least susceptible to outside influences. At the centre of oscillation, a roller on the balance staff momentarily displaces the detent, allowing one tooth of the escape wheel to pass. The escape wheel tooth then imparts its energy on a second roller on the balance staff. Since the escape wheel turns in only one direction, the balance receives impulse in only one direction. On the return oscillation, a passing spring on the tip of the detent allows the unlocking roller on the staff to move by without displacing the detent. The weakest link of any mechanical timekeeper is the escapement's lubrication. When the oil thickens through age or temperature or dissipates through humidity or evaporation, the rate will change, sometimes dramatically as the balance motion decreases through higher friction in the escapement. A detent escapement has a strong advantage over other escapements as it needs no lubrication. An impulse from the escape wheel to the impulse roller is nearly dead-beat, meaning little sliding action needing lubrication. Chronometer escape wheels and passing springs are typically gold due to the metal's lower slide friction over brass and steel.

The Detent Escapement (seen from below) of the Marine Chronometer. Slowed down just before the stone hits the spring.

Chronometers often included other innovations to increase their efficiency and precision. Hard stones such as ruby and sapphire were often used as jewel bearings to decrease friction and wear of the pivots and escapement. Diamond was often used as the cap stone for the lower balance staff pivot to prevent wear from years of the heavy balance turning on the small pivot end. Until the end of mechanical chronometer production in the third quarter of the 20th century, makers continued to experiment with things like ball bearings and chrome-plated pivots.

The timepieces were normally protected from the elements and kept below decks in a fixed position in a traditional box suspended in gimbals (a set of rings connected by bearings). This keeps the chronometer isolated in a horizontal "dial up" position to counter ship inclination (rocking) movements' inducement of timing errors on the balance wheel.

Marine chronometers always contain a maintaining power which keeps the chronometer going while it is being wound, and a power reserve indicator to show how long the chronometer will continue to run without being wound.

These technical provisions usually yield timekeeping in mechanical marine chronometers accurate to within 0.5 second per day.

== Chronometer rating ==
In strictly horological terms, "rating" a chronometer means that prior to the instrument entering service, the average rate of gaining or losing per day is observed and recorded on a rating certificate which accompanies the instrument. This daily rate is used in the field to correct the time indicated by the instrument to get an accurate time reading. Even the best-made chronometer with the finest temperature compensation etc. exhibits two types of error, (1) random and (2) consistent. The quality of design and manufacture of the instrument keeps the random errors small. In principle, the consistent errors should be amenable to elimination by adjustment, but in practice it is not possible to make the adjustment so precisely that this error is completely eliminated, so the technique of rating is used. The rate will also change while the instrument is in service due to e.g. thickening of the oil, so on long expeditions the instrument's rate would be periodically checked against accurate time determined by astronomical observations.

== Marine chronometer use today ==
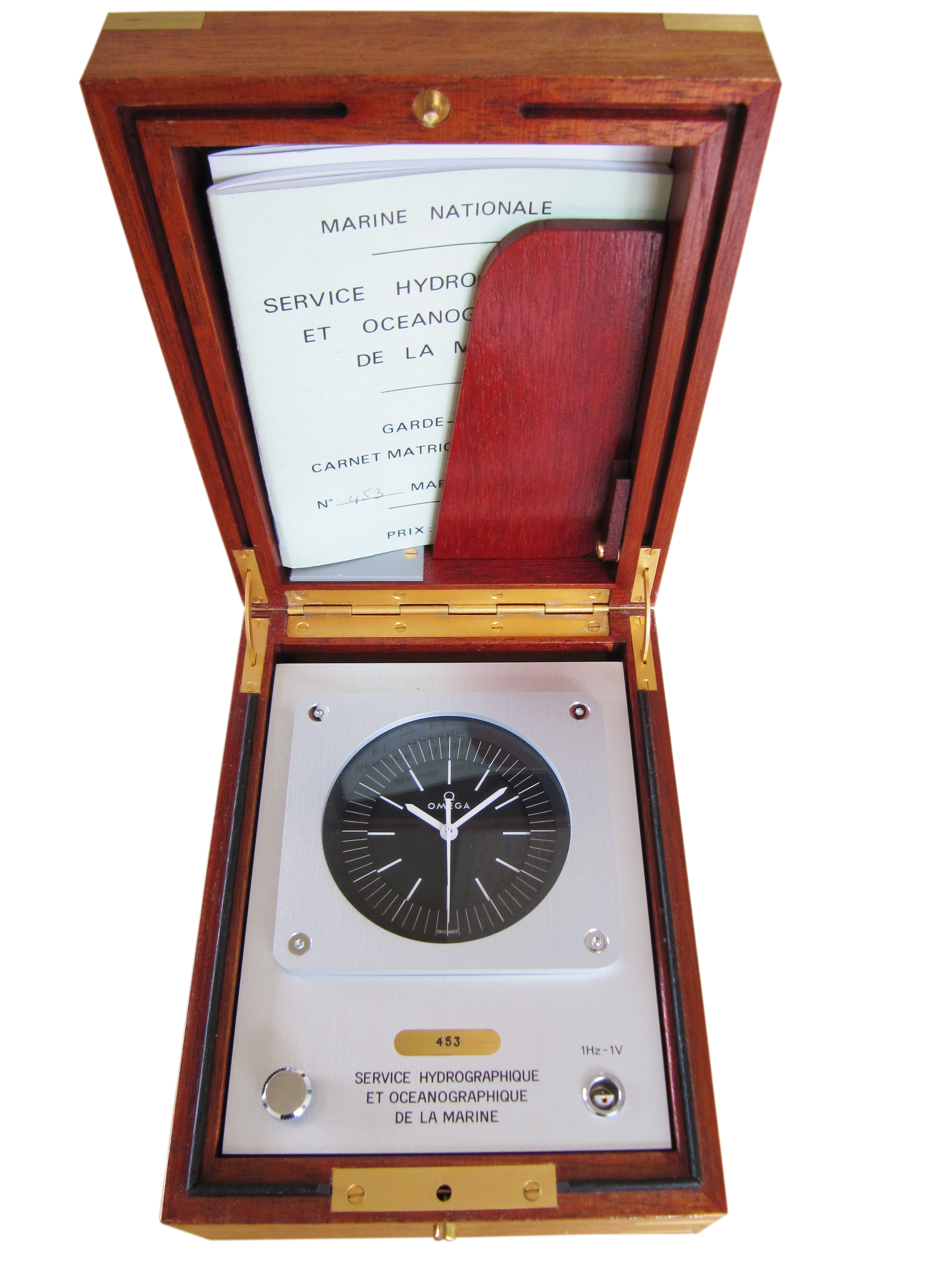
Omega 4.19 MHz (4194304 = 2^{22} high frequency quartz resonator) Ships Marine Chronometer giving an autonomous accuracy of less than ± 5 seconds per year, French Navy issued, 1980. The second hand can advance in 1/2-second increments for optimal timing of celestial objects' angle measurements.

Since the 1990s boats and ships can use several Global Navigation Satellite Systems (GNSS) to navigate all the world's lakes, seas and oceans. Maritime GNSS units include functions useful on water, such as "man overboard" (MOB) functions that allow instantly marking the location where a person has fallen overboard, which simplifies rescue efforts. GNSS may be connected to the ship's self-steering gear and Chartplotters using the NMEA 0183 interface, and can also improve the security of shipping traffic by enabling Automatic Identification Systems (AIS).

Even with these convenient 21st-century technological tools, modern practical navigators usually use celestial navigation using electric-powered time sources in combination with satellite navigation. Small handheld computers, laptops, navigational calculators and even scientific calculators enable modern navigators to "reduce" sextant sights in minutes, by automating all the calculation and/or data lookup steps. Using multiple independent position fix methods without solely relying on subject-to-failure electronic systems helps the navigator detect errors. Professional mariners are still required to be proficient in traditional piloting and celestial navigation, which requires the use of a precisely adjusted and rated autonomous or periodically external time-signal corrected chronometer. These abilities are still a requirement for certain international mariner certifications such as Officer in Charge of Navigational Watch, and Master and Chief Mate deck officers, and supplements offshore yachtmasters on long-distance private cruising yachts.

Modern marine chronometers can be based on quartz clocks that are corrected periodically by satellite time signals or radio time signals (see radio clock). These quartz chronometers are not always the most accurate quartz clocks when no signal is received, and their signals can be lost or blocked. However, there are autonomous quartz movements, even in wrist watches, that are accurate to within 5 or 20 seconds per year. At least one quartz chronometer made for advanced navigation utilizes multiple quartz crystals which are corrected by a computer using an average value, in addition to GPS time signal corrections.

== See also ==
- Celestial navigation
- Clockmaker
- Larcum Kendall
- Noon Gun
- Railroad chronometer
- Radio-controlled watch
- Watchmaker
- Timeline of invention
- Longitude (book)
