= Explosive forming =

Technique in metalworking involving an explosive charge

Explosive forming is a metalworking technique in which an explosive charge is used instead of a punch or press. It can be used on materials for which a press setup would be prohibitively large or require an unreasonably high pressure, and is generally much cheaper than building a large enough and sufficiently high-pressure press; on the other hand, it is unavoidably an individual job production process, producing one product at a time and with a long setup time. There are various approaches; one is to place metal plate over a die, with the intervening space evacuated by a vacuum pump, place the whole assembly underwater, and detonate a charge at an appropriate distance from the plate. For complicated shapes, a segmented die can be used to produce in a single operation a shape that would require many manufacturing steps, or to be manufactured in parts and welded together with an accompanying loss of strength at the welds. There is often some degree of work hardening from the explosive-forming process, particularly in mild steel.

== Tooling ==
Tooling can be made out of fiberglass for short-run applications, out of concrete for large parts at medium pressures, or out of ductile iron for high-pressure work; ideally the tooling should have higher yield strength than the material that is being formed, which is a problem since the technique is usually only considered for material which is itself very hard to work.

== History ==
The first commercial industrial application of explosive forming in the United States began in 1950 and was used into the 1970s by The Moore Company in Marceline, Missouri. The purpose was to form proprietary shaped metal cylinders for use as the central structure of industrial axial vane fans. This is detailed in a 1967 N.A.S.A. publication "High-Velocity Metalworking - a survey" at pages 73, 82 & 83. This article misstates the name of company founder Robert David Moore Sr. as "E. R. Moore". Moore ultimately did hold some patents for involved processes.

Explosive forming was used in the 1960s for aerospace applications, such as the chine plates of the SR-71 reconnaissance plane and various Soviet rocket parts; it continued to be developed in Russia, and the organizing committees of such events as EPNM tend to contain many members from the former Soviet Union. It proved particularly useful for making high-strength corrugated parts which would otherwise have to be milled out of ingots much larger than the finished product. An example would be a yacht constructor who produced boat hulls by making a concrete "swimming pool" into which sheet-metal was placed, and when water filled and explosively fired, produced a complete hull-form.

Other uses of explosives for manufacturing take advantage of the shaped charge effect, putting the explosive directly in contact with the metal to be worked; this was used for engraving of thick iron plates as early as the 1890s. See also explosively formed projectiles for a variety of military applications of the same kind of technology.

== Explosive forming of vacuum tube anode (plate) materials ==
In the late 1950s, the General Electric company developed an application for five-layer sheet metal composites that had been created using the explosive forming process. GE engineers used this innovative composite material to produce multi-layer vacuum tube anodes (aka "plates") with superior heat transfer characteristics. This characteristic allowed GE to build significantly higher power vacuum tubes from existing designs without expensive engineering, design, and tooling changes, providing a substantial competitive market advantage to GE in the burgeoning Hi-Fi amplifier market.

In January 1960 it was reported in contemporary GE technical literature that this five-layer material was the design breakthrough which made possible the new 6L6GC. The 6L6GC was a 6L6 variant able to dissipate 26% more power compared to the otherwise identically constructed 6L6GB. According to General Electric engineer R.E. Moe, then Manager of Engineering at G.E.'s Owensboro Kentucky facility, these increases were made possible by the application of the improved multi-layer plate material.

GE sourced this material from a Texas-based firm (Texas Instruments) which is reported to be the source of the explosively forged five-layer raw material specified by General Electric engineers. This manufacturer used explosive sheet metal forging processes previously developed for another customer (possibly the U.S. Navy?) The explosively formed dissimilar materials had substantially improved evenness of heat transfer thanks to the copper center layer.

GE engineers quickly saw the potential for improved heat transfer characteristics in several already popular pentode and beam tetrode vacuum tube designs, including the 6L6GB, the 7189, and eventually the 6550. The application of the five-layer (Al-Fe-Cu-Fe-Al) material to anode manufacture solved the problem of irregular heat buildup at high power levels in the anode plates of power pentodes, tetrodes, and triodes. This irregular heat buildup leads to physical distortion of the tube's plate. If allowed to continue, this spot overheating eventually results in warpage which allows physical contact and subsequent short circuits between the plate, grids, and beam formers in the tube. Such contact shorts destroy the tube.

General Electric's novel application of this innovative composite led to the creation of the 7189A variant, released in late 1959, along with the 6L6GC and other variants. By 1969, the 6550A variant had also been developed to take advantage of explosively forged composites. GE's application allowed for improved power levels in a number of already popular tube designs, an innovation which helped pave the way for substantially higher power vacuum tube stereo and musical instrument amplifiers in the 1960s and early 1970s.
