= Earth mass =

Unit of mass equal to that of Earth

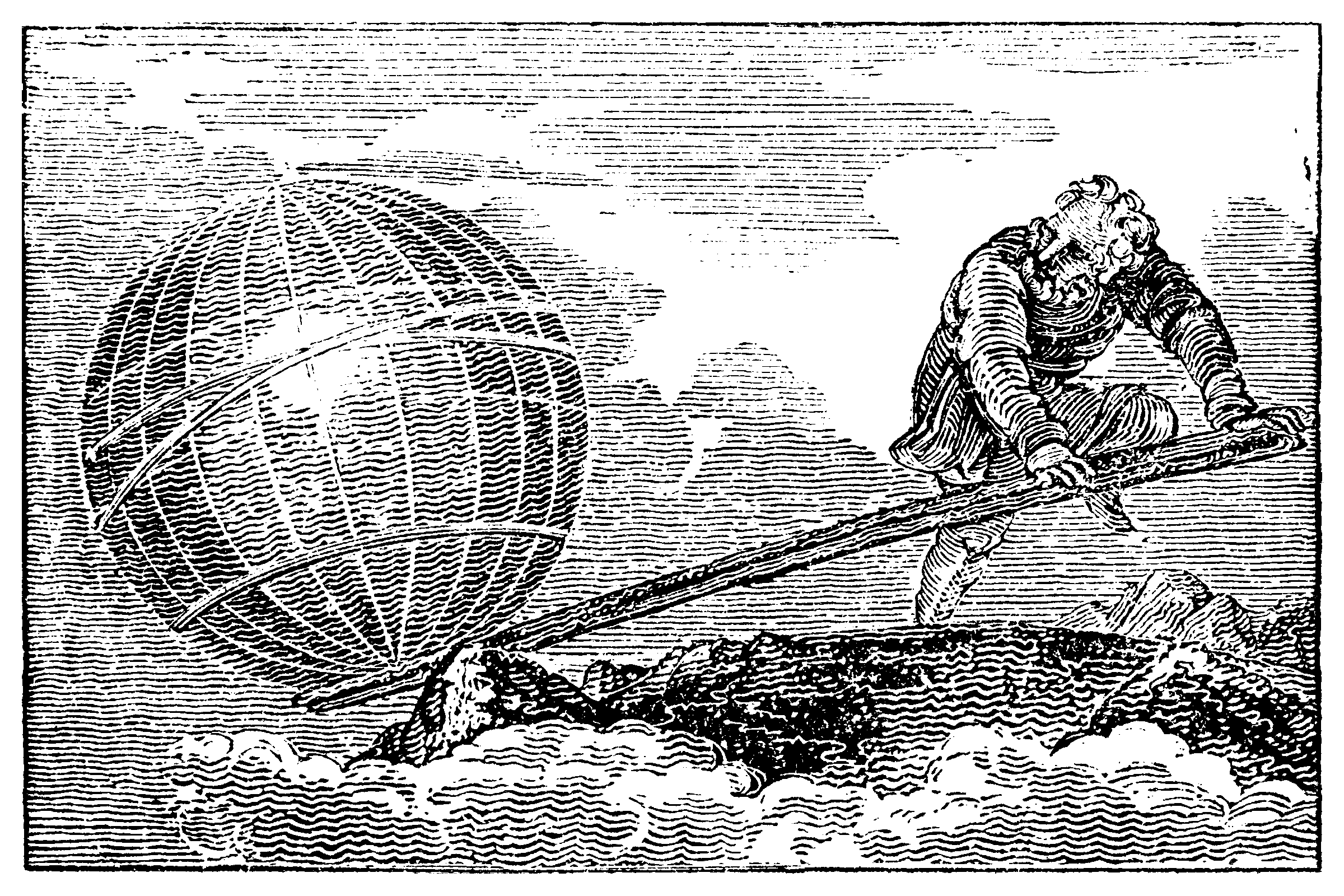
- 19th-century illustration of Archimedes' quip of "give me a lever long enough and a fulcrum on which to place it, and I will move the earth"

General information
- Unit system: astronomy
- Unit of: mass
- Symbol: M_{🜨}

Conversions
1 M_{🜨} in ...	... is equal to ...
- SI base unit: (5.9722±0.0006)×10^{24} kg
- U.S. customary: ≈ 1.3166×10^{25} pounds

An Earth mass (denoted as M_{🜨}, M_{♁} or M_{E}, where 🜨 and ♁ are the astronomical symbols for Earth), is a unit of mass equal to the mass of the planet Earth. The current best estimate for the mass of Earth is M_{🜨} = 5.9722×10^{24} kg, with a relative uncertainty of 10^{−4}. It is equivalent to an average density of 5515 kg/m^{3}. Using the nearest metric prefix, the Earth mass is approximately six ronnagrams, or 6.0 Rg.

The Earth mass is a standard unit of mass in astronomy that is used to indicate the masses of other planets, including rocky terrestrial planets and exoplanets. One Solar mass is close to 333000 Earth masses. The Earth mass excludes the mass of the Moon. The mass of the Moon is about 1.2% of that of the Earth, so the mass of the Earth–Moon system is close to 6.0457×10^{24} kg.

Most of the mass is accounted for by iron and oxygen (c. 32% each), magnesium and silicon (c. 15% each), calcium, aluminium and nickel (c. 1.5% each).

Precise measurement of the Earth mass is difficult, as it is equivalent to measuring the gravitational constant, which is the fundamental physical constant known with least accuracy, due to the relative weakness of the gravitational force. The mass of the Earth was first measured with any accuracy (within about 20% of the correct value) in the Schiehallion experiment in the 1770s, and within 1% of the modern value in the Cavendish experiment of 1798.

== Unit of mass in astronomy ==
The mass of Earth is estimated to be:

$$M_\oplus=(5.9722\;\pm\;0.0006)\times10^{24}\;\mathrm{kg}$$,

which can be expressed in terms of solar mass as:

$$M_\oplus=\frac{1}{332\;946.0487\;\pm\;0.0007}\;M_\odot \approx 3.003\times10^{-6}\;M_\odot$$.

The ratio of Earth mass to lunar mass has been measured to great accuracy. The current best estimate is:

$$M_\oplus/M_L=81.3005678\;\pm\;0.0000027$$

Masses of noteworthy astronomical objects relative to the mass of Earth
Object	Earth mass M_{🜨}	Ref
Moon	0.0123000371(4)	
Sun	332946.0487±0.0007	
Mercury	0.0553	
Venus	0.815	
Earth	1	by definition
Mars	0.107	
Jupiter	317.8	
Saturn	95.2	
Uranus	14.5	
Neptune	17.1	
Pluto	0.0025	
Eris	0.0027	
Gliese 667 Cc	3.8	
Kepler-442b	1.0 – 8.2	

The product of M_{🜨} and the universal gravitational constant (G) is known as the geocentric gravitational constant (GM_{🜨}) and equals (398600441.8±0.8)×10^{6} m^{3} s^{−2}. It is determined using laser ranging data from Earth-orbiting satellites, such as LAGEOS-1. GM_{🜨} can also be calculated by observing the motion of the Moon or the period of a pendulum at various elevations, although these methods are less precise than observations of artificial satellites.

The relative uncertainty of GM_{🜨} is just 2×10^{−9}, considerably smaller than the relative uncertainty for M_{🜨} itself. M_{🜨} can be found out only by dividing GM_{🜨} by G, and G is known only to a relative uncertainty of 2.2×10^{−5}, so M_{🜨} will have the same uncertainty at best. For this reason and others, astronomers prefer to use GM_{🜨}, or mass ratios (masses expressed in units of Earth mass or Solar mass) rather than mass in kilograms when referencing and comparing planetary objects.

== Composition ==
Earth's density varies considerably, between less than 2700 kg/m^{3} in the upper crust to as much as 13000 kg/m^{3} in the inner core. The Earth's core accounts for 15% of Earth's volume but more than 30% of the mass, the mantle for 84% of the volume and close to 70% of the mass, while the crust accounts for less than 1% of the mass. About 90% of the mass of the Earth is composed of the iron–nickel alloy (95% iron) in the core (30%), and the silicon dioxides (c. 33%) and magnesium oxide (c. 27%) in the mantle and crust. Minor contributions are from iron(II) oxide (5%), aluminium oxide (3%) and calcium oxide (2%), besides numerous trace elements (in elementary terms: iron and oxygen c. 32% each, magnesium and silicon c. 15% each, calcium, aluminium and nickel c. 1.5% each). Carbon accounts for 0.03%, water for 0.02%, and the atmosphere for about one part per million.

== History of measurement ==
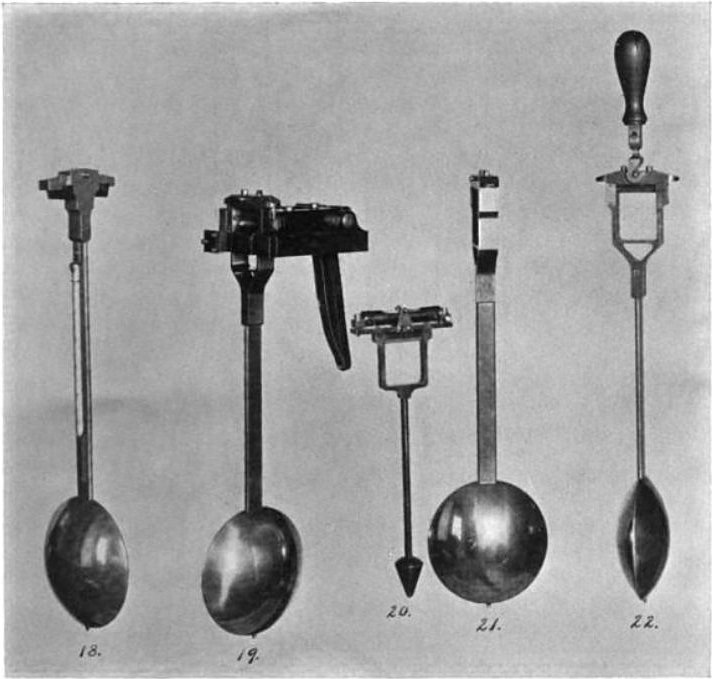
Pendulums used in Mendenhall gravimeter apparatus, from 1897 scientific journal. The portable gravimeter developed in 1890 by Thomas C. Mendenhall provided the most accurate relative measurements of the local gravitational field of the Earth.

The mass of Earth is measured indirectly by determining other quantities such as Earth's density, gravity, or gravitational constant. The first measurement in the 1770s Schiehallion experiment resulted in a value about 20% too low. The Cavendish experiment of 1798 found the correct value within 1%. Uncertainty was reduced to about 0.2% by the 1890s, to 0.1% by 1930.

The figure of the Earth has been known to better than four significant digits since the 1960s (WGS66), so that since that time, the uncertainty of the Earth mass is determined essentially by the uncertainty in measuring the gravitational constant. Relative uncertainty was cited at 0.06% in the 1970s, and at 0.01% (10^{−4}) by the 2000s. The current relative uncertainty of 10^{−4} amounts to 6×10^{20} kg in absolute terms, of the order of the mass of a minor planet (70% of the mass of Ceres).

=== Early estimates ===
Before the direct measurement of the gravitational constant, estimates of the Earth mass were limited to estimating Earth's mean density from observation of the crust and estimates on Earth's volume. Estimates on the volume of the Earth in the 17th century were based on a circumference estimate of 60 miles (97 km) to the degree of latitude, corresponding to a radius of 5500 km (86% of the Earth's actual radius of about 6371 km), resulting in an estimated volume of about one third smaller than the correct value.

The average density of the Earth was not accurately known. Earth was assumed to consist either mostly of water (Neptunism) or mostly of igneous rock (Plutonism), both suggesting average densities far too low, consistent with a total mass of the order of 10^{24} kg. Isaac Newton estimated, without access to reliable measurement, that the density of Earth would be five or six times as great as the density of water, which is surprisingly accurate (the modern value is 5.515). Newton under-estimated the Earth's volume by about 30%, so that his estimate would be roughly equivalent to (4.2±0.5)×10^{24} kg.

In the 18th century, knowledge of Newton's law of universal gravitation permitted indirect estimates on the mean density of the Earth, via estimates of (what in modern terminology is known as) the gravitational constant. Early estimates on the mean density of the Earth were made by observing the slight deflection of a pendulum near a mountain, as in the Schiehallion experiment. Newton considered the experiment in Principia, but pessimistically concluded that the effect would be too small to be measurable.

An expedition from 1737 to 1740 by Pierre Bouguer and Charles Marie de La Condamine attempted to determine the density of Earth by measuring the period of a pendulum (and therefore the strength of gravity) as a function of elevation. The experiments were carried out in Ecuador and Peru, on Pichincha Volcano and mount Chimborazo. Bouguer wrote in a 1749 paper that they had been able to detect a deflection of 8 seconds of arc, the accuracy was not enough for a definite estimate on the mean density of the Earth, but Bouguer stated that it was at least sufficient to prove that the Earth was not hollow.

=== Schiehallion experiment ===
That a further attempt should be made on the experiment was proposed to the Royal Society in 1772 by Nevil Maskelyne, Astronomer Royal. He suggested that the experiment would "do honour to the nation where it was made" and proposed Whernside in Yorkshire, or the Blencathra-Skiddaw massif in Cumberland as suitable targets. The Royal Society formed the Committee of Attraction to consider the matter, appointing Maskelyne, Joseph Banks and Benjamin Franklin amongst its members. The Committee despatched the astronomer and surveyor Charles Mason to find a suitable mountain.

After a lengthy search over the summer of 1773, Mason reported that the best candidate was Schiehallion, a peak in the central Scottish Highlands. The mountain stood in isolation from any nearby hills, which would reduce their gravitational influence, and its symmetrical east–west ridge would simplify the calculations. Its steep northern and southern slopes would allow the experiment to be sited close to its centre of mass, maximising the deflection effect. Nevil Maskelyne, Charles Hutton and Reuben Burrow performed the experiment, completed by 1776. Hutton (1778) reported that the mean density of the Earth was estimated at 9/5 that of Schiehallion mountain. This corresponds to a mean density about 4 1/2 higher than that of water (i.e., about 4.5 g/cm^{3}), about 20% below the modern value, but still significantly larger than the mean density of normal rock, suggesting for the first time that the interior of the Earth might be substantially composed of metal. Hutton estimated this metallic portion to occupy some 20/31 (or 65%) of the diameter of the Earth (modern value 55%). With a value for the mean density of the Earth, Hutton was able to set some values to Jérôme Lalande's planetary tables, which had previously only been able to express the densities of the major Solar System objects in relative terms.

=== Cavendish experiment ===
Henry Cavendish (1798) was the first to attempt to measure the gravitational attraction between two bodies directly in the laboratory. Earth's mass could be then found by combining two equations; Newton's second law, and Newton's law of universal gravitation.

In modern notation, the mass of the Earth is derived from the gravitational constant and the mean Earth radius by

$$M_\oplus =\frac{ GM_\oplus}{ G } = \frac{ g R_\oplus^2}{G}.$$

Where gravity of Earth, "little g", is

$$g = G\frac{M_\oplus}{R_\oplus^2}$$.

Cavendish found a mean density of 5.45 g/cm^{3}, about 1% below the modern value.

=== 19th century ===
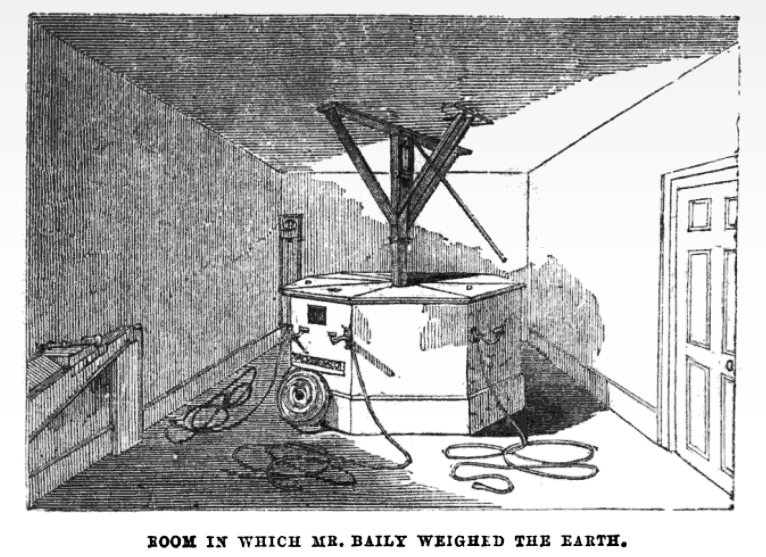
Experimental setup by Francis Baily and Henry Foster to determine the density of Earth using the Cavendish method.

While the mass of the Earth is implied by stating the Earth's radius and density, it was not usual to state the absolute mass explicitly prior to the introduction of scientific notation using powers of 10 in the later 19th century, because the absolute numbers would have been too awkward. Ritchie (1850) gives the mass of the Earth's atmosphere as "11,456,688,186,392,473,000 lbs". (1.1×10^{19} lb = 5.0×10^{18} kg, modern value is 5.15×10^{18} kg) and states that "compared with the weight of the globe this mighty sum dwindles to insignificance".

Absolute figures for the mass of the Earth are cited only beginning in the second half of the 19th century, mostly in popular rather than expert literature. An early such figure was given as "14 septillion pounds" (14 Quadrillionen Pfund) [6.5×10^{24} kg] in Masius (1859). Beckett (1871) cites the "weight of the earth" as "5842 quintillion tons" [5.936×10^{24} kg]. Max Eyth cites the "weight of the globe" (Das Gewicht des Erdballs) as "5273 quintillion tons". The "mass of the earth in gravitational measure" is stated as "9.81996×6370980^{2}" in The New Volumes of the Encyclopaedia Britannica (Vol. 25, 1902) with a "logarithm of earth's mass" given as "14.600522" [3.98586×10^{14}]. This is the gravitational parameter in m^{3}·s^{−2} (modern value 3.98600×10^{14}) and not the absolute mass.

Experiments involving pendulums continued to be performed in the first half of the 19th century. By the second half of the century, these were outperformed by repetitions of the Cavendish experiment, and the modern value of G (and hence, of the Earth mass) is still derived from high-precision repetitions of the Cavendish experiment.

In 1821, Francesco Carlini determined a density value of ρ = 4.39 g/cm^{3} through measurements made with pendulums in the Milan area. This value was refined in 1827 by Edward Sabine to 4.77 g/cm^{3}, and then in 1841 by Carlo Ignazio Giulio to 4.95 g/cm^{3}. On the other hand, George Biddell Airy sought to determine ρ by measuring the difference in the period of a pendulum between the surface and the bottom of a mine. The first tests and experiments took place in Cornwall between 1826 and 1828. The experiment was a failure due to a fire and a flood. Finally, in 1854, Airy got the value 6.6 g/cm^{3} by measurements in a coal mine in Harton, South Shields. Airy's method assumed that the Earth had a spherical stratification. Later, in 1883, the experiments conducted by Robert von Sterneck (1839 to 1910) at different depths in mines of Saxony and Bohemia provided the average density values ρ between 5.0 and 6.3 g/cm^{3}. This led to the concept of isostasy, which limits the ability to accurately measure ρ, by either the deviation from vertical of a plumb line or using pendulums. Despite the little chance of an accurate estimate of the average density of the Earth in this way, Thomas Corwin Mendenhall in 1880 realized a gravimetry experiment in Tokyo and at the top of Mount Fuji. The result was ρ = 5.77 g/cm^{3}.

=== Modern value ===
The uncertainty in the modern value for the Earth's mass has been entirely due to the uncertainty in the gravitational constant G since at least the 1960s. G is notoriously difficult to measure, and some high-precision measurements during the 1980s to 2010s have yielded mutually exclusive results. Sagitov (1969) based on the measurement of G by Heyl and Chrzanowski (1942) cited a value of M_{🜨} = 5.973(3)×10^{24} kg (relative uncertainty 5×10^{−4}).

Accuracy has improved only slightly since then. Most modern measurements are repetitions of the Cavendish experiment, with results (within standard uncertainty) ranging between 6.672 and 6.676×10^{−11} m^{3}/kg/s^{2} (relative uncertainty 3×10^{−4}) in results reported since the 1980s, although the 2014 CODATA recommended value is close to 6.674×10^{−11} m^{3}/kg/s^{2} with a relative uncertainty below 10^{−4}. The Astronomical Almanach Online as of 2016 recommends a standard uncertainty of 1×10^{−4} for Earth mass, M_{🜨} = 5.9722(6)×10^{24} kg

== Variation ==
Earth's mass is variable, subject to both gain and loss due to the accretion of in-falling material, including micrometeorites and cosmic dust and the loss of hydrogen and helium gas, respectively. The combined effect is a net loss of material, estimated at 5.5×10^{7} kg per year. The 5.5×10^{7} kg annual net loss is essentially due to 100,000 tons lost due to atmospheric escape, and an average of 45,000 tons gained from in-falling dust and meteorites. This is well within the mass uncertainty of 0.01% (6×10^{20} kg), so the estimated value of Earth's mass is unaffected by this factor.

Mass loss is due to atmospheric escape of gases. About 95,000 tons of hydrogen per year (3 kg/s) and 1,600 tons of helium per year are lost through atmospheric escape. The main factor in mass gain is in-falling material, cosmic dust, meteors, etc. are the most significant contributors to Earth's increase in mass. The sum of material is estimated to be 37000 to 78000 tons annually, although this can vary significantly; to take an extreme example, the Chicxulub impactor, with a midpoint mass estimate of 2.3×10^{17} kg, added 900 million times that annual dustfall amount to the Earth's mass in a single event.

Additional changes in mass are due to the mass–energy equivalence principle, although these changes are relatively negligible. Mass loss due to the combination of nuclear fission and natural radioactive decay is estimated to amount to 16 tons per year.

An additional loss due to spacecraft on escape trajectories has been estimated at 65 tons per year since the mid-20th century. Earth lost about 3473 tons in the initial 53 years of the space age, but the trend is currently decreasing.

== See also ==
- Abundance of elements in Earth's crust
- Cavendish experiment
- Earth radius
- Orders of magnitude (mass)
- Planetary mass
- Solar mass
- Internal structure of Earth
