= Dinwoodie =

Dinwoodie or Dinwoody may refer to:

== People ==
- David Dinwoodie (born 1965), American anthropologist
- Hubert Dinwoodie (1896–1968), Royal Air Force officer
- James Dinwiddie (astronomer) (1746 - 1815), Scottish natural philosopher
- Tom Dinwoodie (born 1954), entrepreneur and inventor

== Other uses ==
- Dinwoodie railway station, former railway station near Lockerbie, Scotland
- Dinwoody Glacier, located in the Shoshone National Forest, Wyoming
- Henry Dinwoody House, late Victorian house located in Salt Lake City, Utah
- Dinwoody Formation, geologic formation in Montana

== See also ==
- Leofric Hay-Dinwoody (fl. 1925–1932), Anglican priest
- Dunwoody (disambiguation)
- Dinwiddie (disambiguation)
- Dinwoodey
