= Dinwiddie (surname) =

Dinwiddie (also Dinwiddy) is a surname. Notable people with the name include:

== Dinwiddie ==
- Bill Dinwiddie (born 1943), American basketball player
- Gene Dinwiddie (1936–2002), American blues saxophonist
- Hardaway Hunt Dinwiddie (1844–1887), 4th President of Texas A&M, founding member of Alpha Tau Omega
- James Dinwiddie (surgeon), Confederate military surgeon
- James Dinwiddie (astronomer) (1746–1815), Scottish natural philosopher
- Marcus Dinwiddie (1906–1951), American sport shooter
- Michael Dinwiddie (1954–2025), American playwright and professor
- Robert Dinwiddie (1693–1770), British lieutenant governor of colonial Virginia
- Robert Dinwiddie (golfer) (born 1982), English golfer
- Ryan Dinwiddie (born 1980), American gridiron football quarterback
- Spencer Dinwiddie (born 1993), American professional basketball player
- Traci Dinwiddie (born 1973), American film and television actress
- William Dinwiddie (1867–1934), American journalist, war photographer, writer and colonial administrator in the Philippines

== Dinwiddy ==
- Bruce Dinwiddy (1946–2021), governor of the Cayman Islands
- Hugh Dinwiddy (1912–2009), English cricketer

== See also ==
- Dinwiddie (disambiguation)
