= James Dinwiddie =

James Dinwiddie may refer to:

- James Dinwiddie (surgeon), American Confederate military surgeon
- James Dinwiddie (astronomer), Scottish physicist, astronomer, inventor and natural philosopher
- James A. Dinwiddie, member of the Virginia Senate

== See also ==
- James M. Dinwiddie House, near Dover, Lafayette County, Missouri.
