= Robert Waddington =

Robert Waddington may refer to:

- Robert Waddington (priest) (1927–2007), British Anglican priest
- Robert Waddington (mathematician) (died 1779), mathematician, astronomer and teacher of navigation
- Robert Waddington (politician), British MP
