= Reuben Burrow =

English mathematician, surveyor and orientalist (1747-1792)

Reuben Burrow (30 December 1747 – 7 June 1792) was an English mathematician, surveyor and orientalist. Initially a teacher, he was appointed assistant to Sir Nevil Maskelyne, the fifth Astronomer Royal, at the Royal Greenwich Observatory, and was involved in the Schiehallion experiment. He later conducted research in India, teaching himself Sanskrit and becoming one of the first members of the Asiatic Society. He was the first to measure the length of a degree of an arc of longitude along the Tropic of Cancer. His other major achievements included a study of Indian mathematics, although he earned a reputation for being rude and unpolished amid the leading figures in science who came mostly from the upper-class. One commentator called him "an able mathematician but a most vulgar and scurrilous dog."

== Biography ==
Burrow was born at Hoberley, near Shadwell, Leeds. His father, a small tenant farmer, gave him some schooling, occasionally interrupted by labour on the farm. He showed an ability and keenness for mathematics early on, and received some instruction from a schoolmaster named Crooks at Leeds. At the age of 18 he walked for four days, all the way from Leeds to London, to seek a job and obtained a clerkship in the office of a London merchant. A year later he became usher in a school of Benjamin Webb, the ‘celebrated writing-master.’ He next set up as schoolmaster on his own account at Portsmouth. Here he taught mathematics for navigation to aspiring midshipmen. His reputation in mathematics reached Nevil Maskelyne and he received an offer for a position of "labourer" at the Greenwich Observatory. Burrow, an argumentative man, was however unable to work with the genteel and refined astronomer-royal and he soon left. In 1772 he married Anne Purvis, daughter of a poulterer in Leadenhall Street, and started a school at Greenwich.

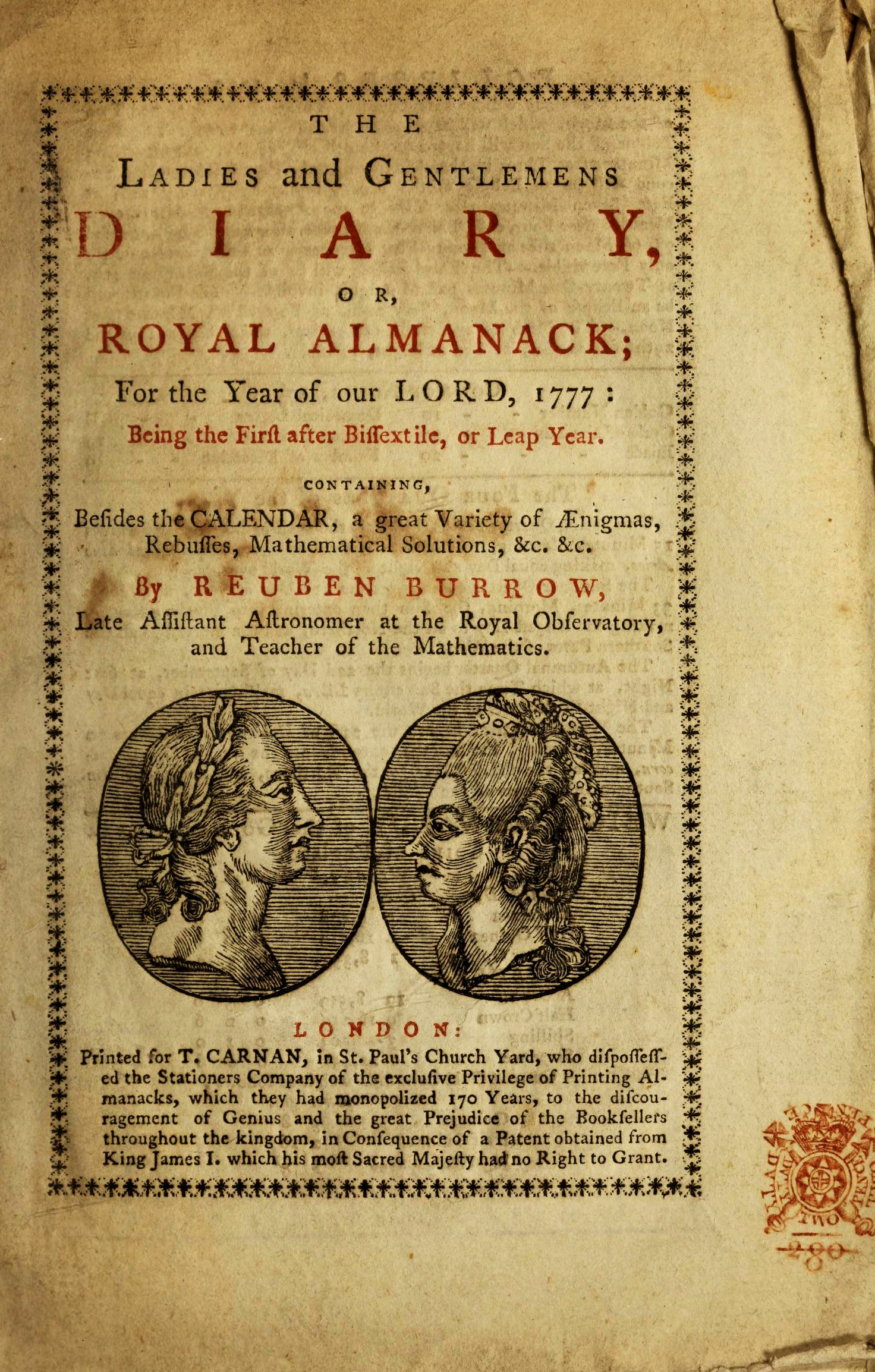
Cover of Ladies and Gentlemens Diary

In 1774, Burrow and William Menzies, a local land surveyor, aided Maskelyne in his observations in the Schiehallion experiment, to examine the deflection by gravity of the plumbline towards the mountain. He complained later that his services were insufficiently recognised. Burrow was liable to use words of abuse at anyone and he did not think Maskelyne deserved his position. Soon afterwards, however, he was appointed ‘mathematical teacher in the drawing-room at the Tower,’ where there was then a training school for artillery officers, afterwards merged into the Royal Military Academy, Woolwich. His salary was £100 a year. Here he became editor of the Ladies and Gentlemen's Diary, or Royal Almanack. It was started by Thomas Carnan, in opposition to the Ladies' Diary, published by the Stationers' Company and edited by Charles Hutton and like it included mathematical puzzles. The company claimed a monopoly of almanacs, but their claim was disallowed by the court of common pleas, on their bringing an action against Carnan, who published the first number of his diary in December 1775. It continued till 1786, the word 'Gentlemen' being dropped after 1780. Part of it was devoted to mathematical problems by Burrow and various contributors. Burrow quarrelled with his rival, Charles Hutton. Falling out with Maskelyne and others, he eked out his living by taking private pupils, and did a little work for publishers; a bit of work at London brought him in contact with Colonel Henry Watson, for many years chief engineer in Bengal under Lord Clive. Watson recommended him to Lord Townsend as a good candidate "to teach mathematics to the Cadets of the drawing room" of the tower. In 1777 he worked on a survey of the coast "from Naze in Essex to Hollseby bay in Sussex" (actually Suffolk) to assess vulnerabilities to attack by the French. He was joined by a party of pupils and the fleet was commanded by Admiral Howe. He later complained to master-general of the ordnance, the duke of Richmond, that he was not paid "a farthing". Henry Watson in the meantime was recalled to Bengal and offered to take Burrow along. Burrow resigned on 30 April 1782 "in order to go to the East Indies."

=== India ===
Burrow left his wife and growing family behind and boarded the east indiaman General Coote. The journey included fights with others including the first mate who Burrow suspected of plotting a mutiny. Soon after reaching India he wrote to the Governor-General Warren Hastings, a school friend of Maskelyne, stating his desire to generate more money in order to conduct further research. For a while he earned a living by teaching in Calcutta and it was reported that one of his Kashmiri students, Tafazzul Husain Khan Kashmiri (studied under James Dinwiddie and died in 1800), was translating Newton's Principia into Persian. He was also interested in ancient geometry, as shown by his book on Apollonius: A Restitution of the Geometrical Treatise of Apollonius Pergæus on Inclinations (1779), and was curious to investigate the mathematical treatises in ancient Hindu and other Oriental literature. He later published Hindoo Knowledge of the Binomial Theorem. He asked for Hastings's encouragement; and other letters and papers show that he pursued these inquiries, having learnt Sanskrit on his own for the purpose (he already knew Latin, French and Italian and had picked up some Arabic and Persian), and collected many Sanskrit and Persian manuscripts. He was appointed mathematical teacher of the engineers' corps, and afterwards had some employment in connection with a proposed trigonometrical survey of Bengal.

Burrow was one of the first members of The Asiatic Society founded by fellow orientalist William Jones and contributed to their research. In 1788, William Roy suggested that Burrow would be ideally qualified to conduct a geometrical survey of Bengal. In 1790 Burrow wrote to the directors of the East India Company to set up an "Indian Greenwich". It was turned down as the Madras Observatory was being considered around the same time. Burrow had obtained instruments used by the late Colonel Thomas Dean Pearse (1741–1789) and began his measurement of a baseline near Calcutta in 1791. Burrow measured both along the latitude and along the longitude somewhere near Cawksally near Krishnagar in Nadia District. His equipment was not standard and there were a lot of errors arising from methodology. From his observations a length of a meridian arc along the Tropic of Cancer was later determined by Isaac Dalby as 362,742 feet, or 68.70 miles (105.64 km). Weakened by malaria, Burrow died at Buxar in India on 7 June 1792. His wife, with his son and his three daughters who had joined him in India in 1790 returned after his death. His son died as an officer in the service of the East India Company. A Short Account of the late Mr. Burrow's Measurement of a Degree of Longitude and another of Latitude near the tropic in Bengal was published posthumously by his friend Isaac Dalby in 1796. Burrow wrote crude poems and a few written pseudonymously lampooned Maskelyne and nearly all his mathematical peers other than William Emerson who had taught him briefly. He earned a reputation for drinking and pugilism with one contemporary calling him "an able mathematician but a most vulgar and scurrilous dog."

== Writings ==
Most of Burrow's writings were in the Asiatick Researchers. A few of his findings were communicated posthumously by his friend Isaac Dalby.

- A method of calculating the moon's parallaxes in latitude and longitude. Asiatic Researches 1:320.
- Hints relative to friction in Mechanics. Asiatic Researches 1:171.
- Remarks on the Artificial Horizon. Asiatic Researches 1:327.
- Demonstration of a theorem concerning the intersection of curves. Asiatic Researches 1:330.
- Corrections of the lunar method of finding the longitude. Asiatic Researches 1:433.
- A synopsis of the different cases that may happen in deducing the longitude of one place from another by means of Arnold's chronometers. Asiatic Researches 2:473.
- A proof that the Hindoos had the binomial theorem. Asiatic Researches 2:487
- Memorandums concerning an old building. Asiatic Researches 2:477
- Observations on some of the eclipses of Jupiter's satellites. Asiatic Researches 2:483
- A demonstration of one of the Hindoo rules of arithmetic. Asiatic Researches 3:145

== See also ==
- Tafazzul Husain Kashmiri
- James Dinwiddie

== External links and Additional References ==
- Simon Schaffer. “The Asiatic Enlightenments of British Astronomy.” In The Brokered World, Go-Betweens and Global Intelligence, 1770-1840, edited by Lissa; Raj Kapil; Delbourgo James Roberts Simon; Science History Publications, U. S. A.; Watson Publishing International LLC, 2009.

discusses Burrow's time in India and his mathematical work in assisting the translation of Newton's Principia into Arabic.

This article incorporates text from a publication now in the public domain: Stephen, Leslie (1886). "Burrow, Reuben". In Stephen, Leslie (ed.). Dictionary of National Biography. Vol. 07. London: Smith, Elder & Co.
