= Thomas Deane Pearse =

British Army officer

Colonel Thomas Deane Pearse
- Born: c. 1741–1742
- Died: 15 June 1789; On the Ganges river, India
- Military career
- Allegiance: Kingdom of Great Britain; East India Company
- Branch: British Army; Bengal Army
- Service years: 1761–1789
- Rank: Colonel
- Units: Royal Artillery; Bengal Artillery
- Conflicts: Second Anglo-Mysore War

Colonel Thomas Dean Pearse (c. 1741/42 – 15 June 1789) was a British Army officer who served as a colonel in the Bengal Army's artillery. He took an interest in astronomy and conducted many surveys during his service in India.

== Biography ==
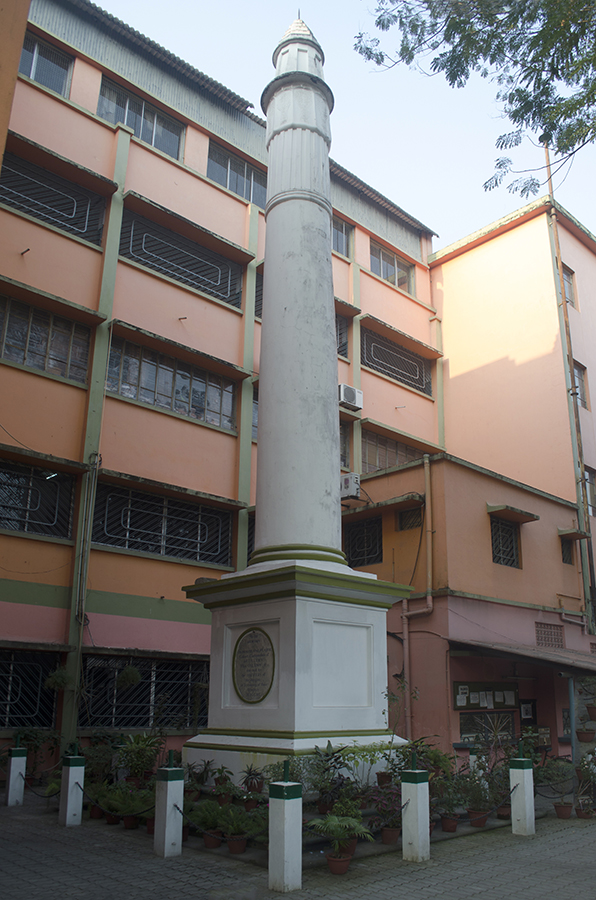
Pearse Memorial, St. Stephen's School, Dum Dum, Kolkata

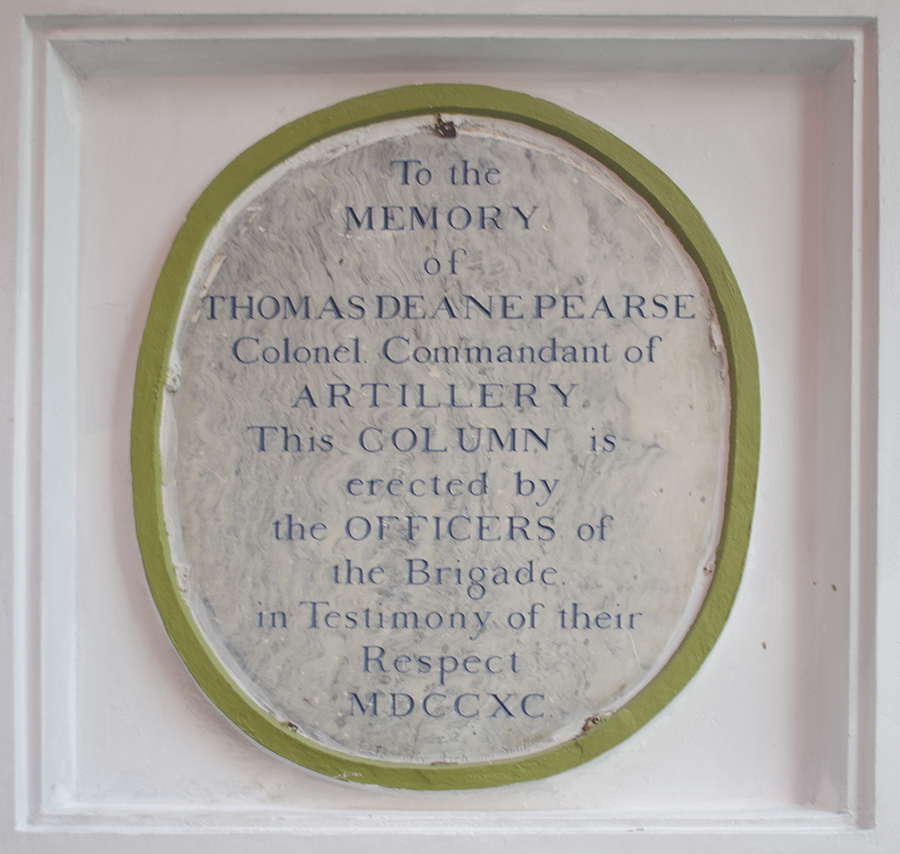
Plaque at Pearse Memorial, St. Stephen's School, Dum Dum, Kolkata

Pearse was born about 1741 or 1742 to Royal Navy Captain Thomas Pearse of Reading and his wife Martha. After passing out from the Royal Military Academy, Woolwich, he was appointed second lieutenant of the Royal Artillery on 24 October 1761, and first lieutenant on 3 February 1766.

In February 1768, he transferred to the East India Company's service. He was made major in the Bengal Army artillery on 2 September 1768 serving in Chunar, lieutenant-colonel on 30 October 1769, and colonel on 12 June 1779. In India he was high in the favour of Warren Hastings, the governor-general, and acted as Hastings' second in his duel with Sir Philip Francis on 17 August 1779.

In 1781, on the formation of the Bengal Sepoy Corps, Warren Hastings resolved on sending a detachment of five regiments to the relief of the presidency of Fort St. George. This important force was assembled at Midnapoor, and the command of it was conferred on Pearse. Artillery officers of the East India Company's army, in the early wars in India, held general commands, and were not, as in the Royal Artillery, confined to their department of the army. The detachment consisted of the 12th, 13th, 24th, 25th, and 26th regiments. They proceeded on their march through Orissa and the Northern Circars. Having reached the vicinity of Madras about the middle of 1781, the Bengal troops joined the other forces in the field, under the commander-in-chief, Sir Eyre Coote.

During the arduous warfare in which they were engaged from that period down to the cessation of hostilities before Cuddalore in June 1783, the Bengal corps, under Pearse, established for themselves a lasting reputation. The attack on the French lines at Cuddalore was one of the first occasions on which European troops and the disciplined natives of India had met at the point of the bayonet. Lieutenant John Kennaway was Pearse's Persian secretary in the campaign.

Some two thousand out of the five thousand troops, the veteran remains of those gallant corps, returned to Bengal early in 1785, when their encampment was visited by governor-general Hastings in person, and his testimony of their services was recorded in the general orders issued at Fort William on 22 January 1785, and three days later in the camp at Ghyretty. In the latter the governor-general desires that "the commanding officer, Colonel Pearse, whom he is proud to call his friend, will make [his thanks] known in public orders to the officers, his countrymen, and to the native officers and private sepoys of the detachment." For his services in the defence of the company's territories in the Carnatic, Pearse received a sword of honour.

Pearse supported the survey plans of Reuben Burrow in Bengal. In May 1785 Pearse contributed a paper on Two Hindu Festivals and the Indian Sphinx to the proceedings of the Asiatic Society at Calcutta, which was subsequently published in Dissertations and Miscellaneous Pieces relating to the History and Antiquities … of Asia, by Sir W. Jones … and others. Dublin, 1793. Pearse died on the Ganges on 15 June 1789. Pearse married a muslim woman Punna Purree (d. 1820) and had a son Thomas Deane Mahomet Pearse. After her husband's death, Punna Purree sought the help of Warren Hastings in raising her son. Thomas Deane went to Oriel College, Oxford in 1795 but little is known of his later life. Pearse also had some illegitimate children.
