= Dunwoody (disambiguation) =

Dunwoody may refer to:

- Dunwoody, Georgia, United States, a city
  - Dunwoody High School
  - Dunwoody (MARTA station), an elevated train station
- Dunwoody College of Technology, a vocational college in Minneapolis, Minnesota
- Dunwoody (surname)
- Dunwoodie, Yonkers
- Saint Joseph's Seminary (Dunwoodie), also known as Dunwoody
- Dunwoody (horse trainer), enslaved by Andrew Jackson
