= Schiehallion experiment =

1774 attempt to measure the Earth's average density

Coordinates: 56°40′4″N 4°5′52″W

The Schiehallion experiment was an 18th-century experiment to determine the mean density of the Earth. Funded by a grant from the Royal Society, it was conducted in the summer of 1774 around the Scottish mountain of Schiehallion, Perthshire. The experiment involved measuring the tiny deflection of the vertical due to the gravitational attraction of a nearby mountain. Schiehallion was considered the ideal location after a search for candidate mountains, due to its isolation and almost symmetrical shape.

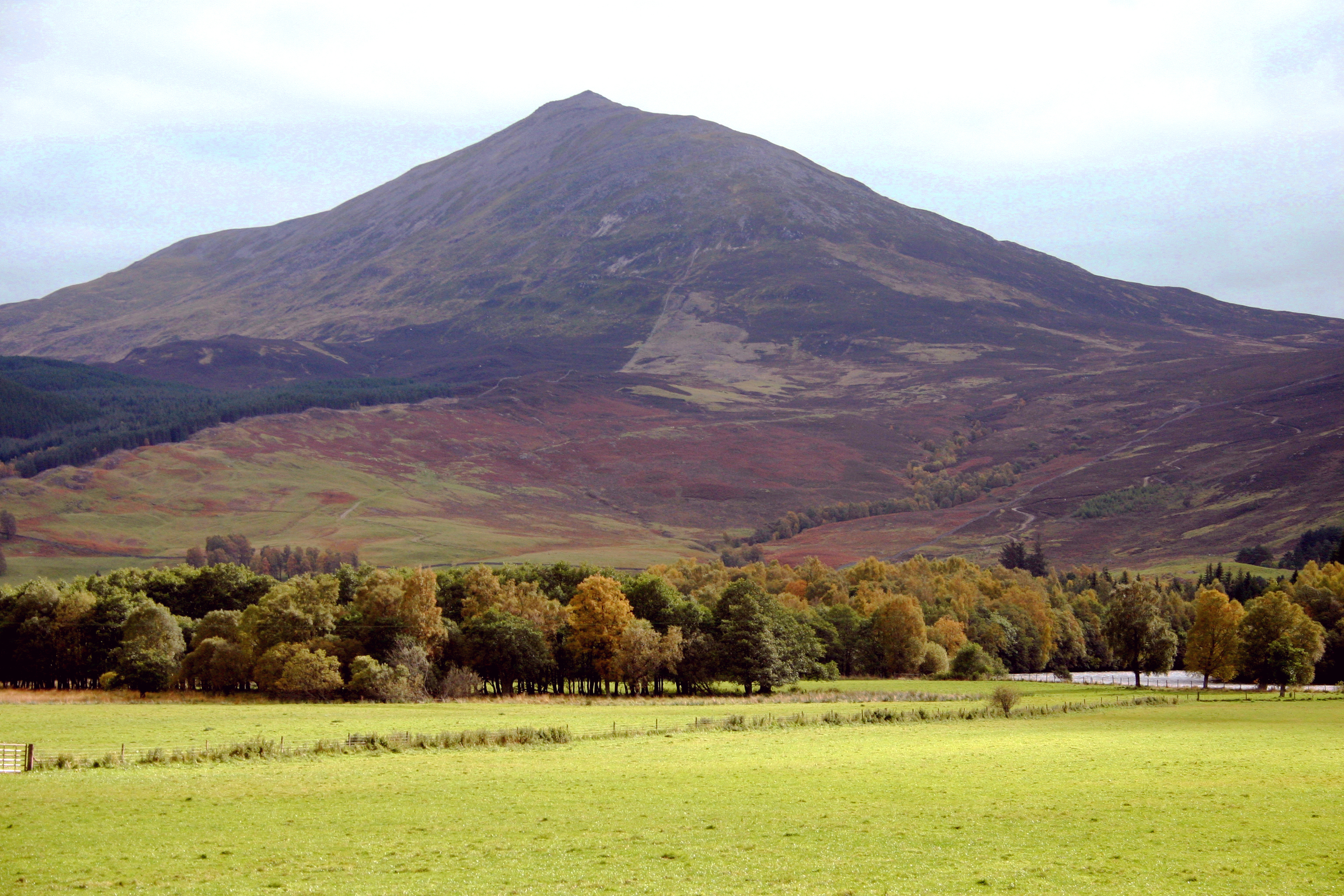
Schiehallion's isolated position and symmetrical shape were well-suited to the experiment.

The experiment had previously been considered, but rejected, by Isaac Newton as a practical demonstration of his theory of gravitation. A team of scientists, notably Nevil Maskelyne, the Astronomer Royal, was later convinced that the effect would be detectable and undertook to conduct the experiment. The deflection angle depended on the relative densities and volumes of the Earth and the mountain: if the density and volume of Schiehallion could be ascertained, then so could the density of the Earth. Once this was known, it would in turn yield approximate values for those of the other planets, their moons, and the Sun, previously known only in terms of their relative ratios.

== Background ==
A pendulum hangs straight downwards in a symmetrical gravitational field. However, if a sufficiently large mass such as a mountain is nearby, its gravitational attraction should pull the pendulum's plumb-bob slightly out of true (in the sense that it does not point to the centre of mass of the Earth). The change in plumb-line angle against a known object—such as a star—could be carefully measured on opposite sides of the mountain. If the mass of the mountain could be independently established from a determination of its volume and an estimate of the mean density of its rocks, then these values could be extrapolated to provide the mean density of the Earth, and by extension, its mass.

Isaac Newton had considered the effect in the Principia, but pessimistically thought that any real mountain would produce too small a deflection to measure. Gravitational effects, he wrote, were only discernible on the planetary scale. Newton's pessimism was unfounded: although his calculations had suggested a deviation of less than 2 minutes of arc (for an idealised three-mile high [5 km] mountain), this angle, though very slight, was within the theoretical capability of instruments of his day.

An experiment to test Newton's idea would provide supporting evidence for both his law of universal gravitation and estimates of the mass and density of the Earth. Since the masses of astronomical objects were known only in terms of relative ratios, the mass of the Earth would provide reasonable values to the other planets, their moons, and the Sun. The data were also capable of determining the value of the Newtonian constant of gravitation G, though this was not a goal of the experimenters; references to a value for G would not appear in the scientific literature until almost a hundred years later.

== Finding the mountain ==
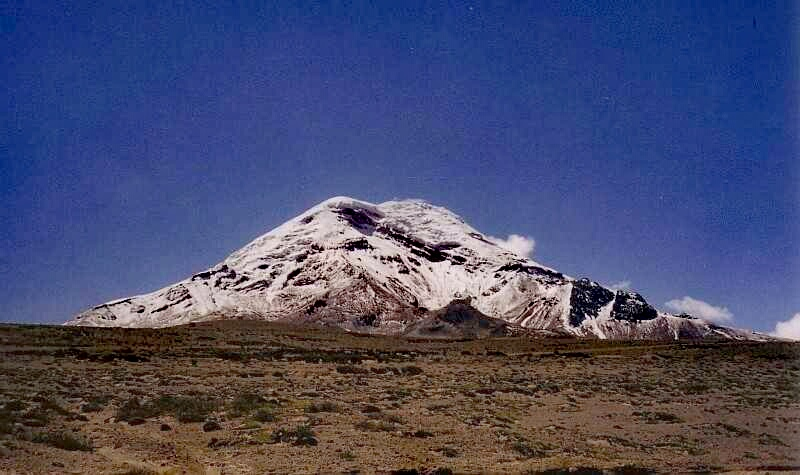
Chimborazo in the Andes in Ecuador, the subject of the French 1738 experiment

=== Chimborazo, 1738 ===
A pair of French astronomers, Pierre Bouguer and Charles Marie de La Condamine, were the first to attempt the experiment, conducting their measurements on the 6,268-metre (20,564 ft) volcano Chimborazo. At the time, this lay in the Real Audiencia of Quito of the Viceroyalty of Peru, and is now in the province of Chimborazo in the Republic of Ecuador. Their expedition had left France for South America in 1735 to try to measure the meridian arc length of one degree of latitude near the equator, but they took advantage of the opportunity to attempt the deflection experiment. In December 1738, under very difficult conditions of terrain and climate, they conducted a pair of measurements at altitudes of 4,680 and 4,340 m. Bouguer wrote in a 1749 paper that they had been able to detect a deflection of 8 seconds of arc, but he downplayed the significance of their results, suggesting that the experiment would be better carried out under easier conditions in France or England. He added that the experiment had at least proved that the Earth could not be a hollow shell, as some thinkers of the day, including Edmond Halley, had suggested.

=== Schiehallion, 1774 ===
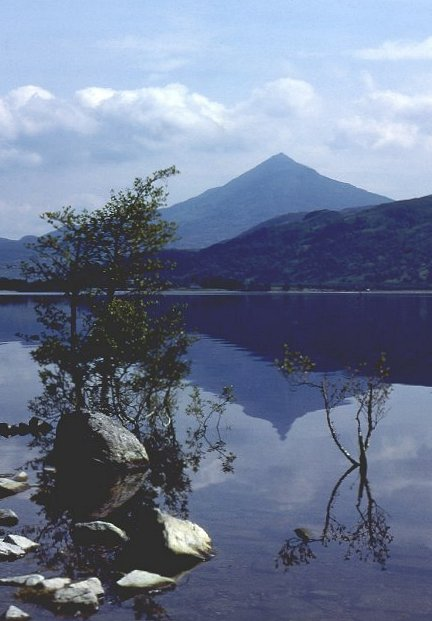
The symmetrical ridge of Schiehallion viewed across Loch Rannoch

Between 1763 and 1767, during operations to survey the Mason–Dixon line between the states of Pennsylvania and Maryland, British astronomers found many more systematic and non-random errors than might have been expected, extending the work longer than planned. When this information reached the members of the Royal Society, Henry Cavendish realized that this effect might have been due to the gravitational pull of the nearby Allegheny Mountains, which had probably diverted the plumb lines of the theodolites and the liquids inside spirit levels.

Prompted by this news, a further attempt on the experiment was proposed to the Royal Society in 1772 by Nevil Maskelyne, Astronomer Royal. He suggested that the experiment would "do honour to the nation where it was made" and proposed Whernside in Yorkshire, or the Blencathra-Skiddaw massif in Cumberland, as suitable targets. The Royal Society formed the Committee of Attraction to consider the matter, appointing Maskelyne, Joseph Banks and Benjamin Franklin amongst its members. The Committee dispatched the astronomer and surveyor Charles Mason to find a suitable mountain.

After a lengthy search over the summer of 1773, Mason reported that the best candidate was Schiehallion (then spelled Schehallien), a 1,083 m (3,553 ft) peak lying between Loch Tay and Loch Rannoch in the central Scottish Highlands. The mountain stood apart from any nearby hills, which would reduce their gravitational influence, and its symmetrical east–west ridge would simplify the calculations. Its steep northern and southern slopes would allow the experiment to be sited close to its centre of mass, maximising the deflection effect.

Mason declined to conduct the work himself for the offered commission of one guinea per day. The task therefore fell to Maskelyne, for which he was granted a temporary leave of his duties as Astronomer Royal. He was aided in the task by mathematician and surveyor Charles Hutton, and Reuben Burrow who was a mathematician of the Royal Greenwich Observatory. A workforce of labourers was engaged to construct observatories for the astronomers and assist in the surveying. The science team was particularly well-equipped: its astronomical instruments included a 12 in (30 cm) brass quadrant from Cook's 1769 transit of Venus expedition, a 10 ft (3.0 m) zenith sector, and a regulator (precision pendulum clock) for timing the astronomical observations. They also acquired a theodolite and Gunter's chain for surveying the mountain, and a pair of barometers for measuring altitude. Generous funding for the experiment was available due to underspend on the transit of Venus expedition, which had been turned over to the Society by King George III.

== Measurements ==
=== Astronomical ===
The deflection is the difference between the true zenith Z as determined by astrometry, and the apparent zenith Z′ as determined by a plumb-line

Observatories were constructed to the north and south of the mountain, plus a bothy to accommodate equipment and the scientists. The ruins of these structures remain on the mountainside. Most of the workforce was housed in rough canvas tents. Maskelyne's astronomical measurements were the first to be conducted. It was necessary for him to determine the zenith distances with respect to the plumb line for a set of stars at the precise time that each passed due south (astronomic latitude). Weather conditions were frequently unfavourable due to mist and rain. Eventually, from the south observatory, he was able to take 76 measurements on 34 stars in one direction, and then 93 observations on 39 stars in the other. From the north side, he then conducted a set of 68 observations on 32 stars and a set of 100 on 37 stars. By conducting sets of measurements with the plane of the zenith sector first facing east and then west, he successfully avoided any systematic errors arising from collimating the sector.

To determine the deflection due to the mountain, it was necessary to account for the curvature of the Earth: an observer moving north or south will see the local zenith shift by the same angle as any change in geodetic latitude. After accounting for observational effects such as precession, aberration of light and nutation, Maskelyne showed that the difference between the locally determined zenith for observers north and south of Schiehallion was 54.6 arc seconds. Once the surveying team had provided a difference of 42.94″ latitude between the two stations, he was able to subtract this, and after rounding to the accuracy of his observations, announce that the sum of the north and south deflections was 11.6″.

Maskelyne published his initial results in the Philosophical Transactions of the Royal Society in 1775, using preliminary data on the mountain's shape and hence the position of its center of gravity. This led him to expect a deflection of 20.9″ if the mean densities of Schiehallion and the Earth were equal. Since the deflection was about half this, he was able to make a preliminary announcement that the mean density of the Earth was approximately double that of Schiehallion. A more accurate value would have to await completion of the surveying process.

Maskelyne took the opportunity to note that Schiehallion exhibited a gravitational attraction, and thus all mountains did; and that Newton's inverse square law of gravitation had been confirmed. An appreciative Royal Society presented Maskelyne with the 1775 Copley Medal. The biographer Chalmers later noted that "If any doubts yet remained with respect to the truth of the Newtonian system, they were now totally removed".

=== Surveying ===
The work of the surveying team was greatly hampered by the inclemency of the weather, and it took until 1776 to complete the task. To find the volume of the mountain, it was necessary to divide it into a set of vertical prisms and compute the volume of each. The triangulation task falling to Charles Hutton was considerable: the surveyors had obtained thousands of bearing angles to more than a thousand points around the mountain. Moreover, the vertices of his prisms did not always conveniently coincide with the surveyed heights. To make sense of all his data, he hit upon the idea of interpolating a series of lines at set intervals between his measured values, marking points of equal height. In doing so, not only could he easily determine the heights of his prisms, but from the swirl of the lines one could get an instant impression of the form of the terrain. Hutton thus used contour lines, which later became commonly used for depicting cartographic relief.

Hutton's solar system density table
Body	Density, kg·m^{−3}	
Body	Hutton, 1778 (Note: Hutton's values are expressed as common fractions as a multiple of the density of water, e.g. Mars $\tfrac{10}{3}$. They have been expressed here as two significant-digit integers, multiplied by a water density of 1000 kg·m^{−3})	Modern value
Sun	1,100	1,408
Mercury	9,200	5,427
Venus	5,800	5,204
Earth	4,500	5,515
Moon	3,100	3,340
Mars	3,300	3,934
Jupiter	1,100	1,326
Saturn	410	687

Hutton had to compute the individual attractions due to each of the many prisms that formed his grid, a process which was as laborious as the survey itself. The task occupied his time for a further two years before he could present his results, which he did in a hundred-page paper to the Royal Society in 1778. From his calculations, which took into account the effect of latitude on gravity, it followed that if the density of the Earth and Schiehallion had been the same, the attraction of the plumb-bob to the Earth would be 9,933 times the sum of its attractions to the mountain at the north and south stations. Yet the measured deflection of 11.6″ meant that Earth attraction was actually 17,804 times as great. From this it follows that the average density of Earth is approximately 1.8 times the density of the mountain. Hutton took a density of 2,500 kg·m^{−3} for Schiehallion, and announced that the density of the Earth was 1.8 times this, or 4,500 kg·m^{−3}, less than 20% away from the modern value of 5,515 kg·m^{−3}.

That the mean density of the Earth should so greatly exceed that of its surface rocks naturally meant that there must be more dense material lying deeper. Hutton correctly surmised that the core material was likely metallic, and might have a density of 10,000 kg·m^{−3}. He estimated this metallic portion to occupy some 65% of the diameter of the Earth. With a value for the mean density of the Earth, Hutton was able to set some values to Jérôme Lalande's planetary tables, which had previously only been able to express the densities of the major solar system objects in relative terms.

== Repeat experiments ==
A more accurate measurement of the mean density of the Earth was made 24 years after Schiehallion, when in 1798 Henry Cavendish used an exquisitely sensitive torsion balance to measure the attraction between large masses of lead. Cavendish's figure of 5,448 ± 33 kg·m^{−3} was only 1.2% from the currently accepted value of 5,515 kg·m^{−3}, and his result would not be significantly improved upon until 1895 by Charles Boys. (Note: A value of 5,480 kg·m^{−3} appears in Cavendish's paper. He had however made an arithmetical error: his measurements actually led to a value of 5,448 kg·m^{−3}; a discrepancy that was not found until 1821 by Francis Baily.) The care with which Cavendish conducted the experiment and the accuracy of his result has led his name to since be associated with it.

The Scottish scientist John Playfair carried out a second survey of Schiehallion in 1811; on the basis of a rethink of its rock strata, he suggested a density of 4,560 to 4,870 kg·m^{−3}, though the then elderly Hutton vigorously defended the original value in an 1821 paper to the Society. Playfair's calculations had raised the density closer towards its modern value, but was still too low and significantly poorer than Cavendish's computation of some years earlier.

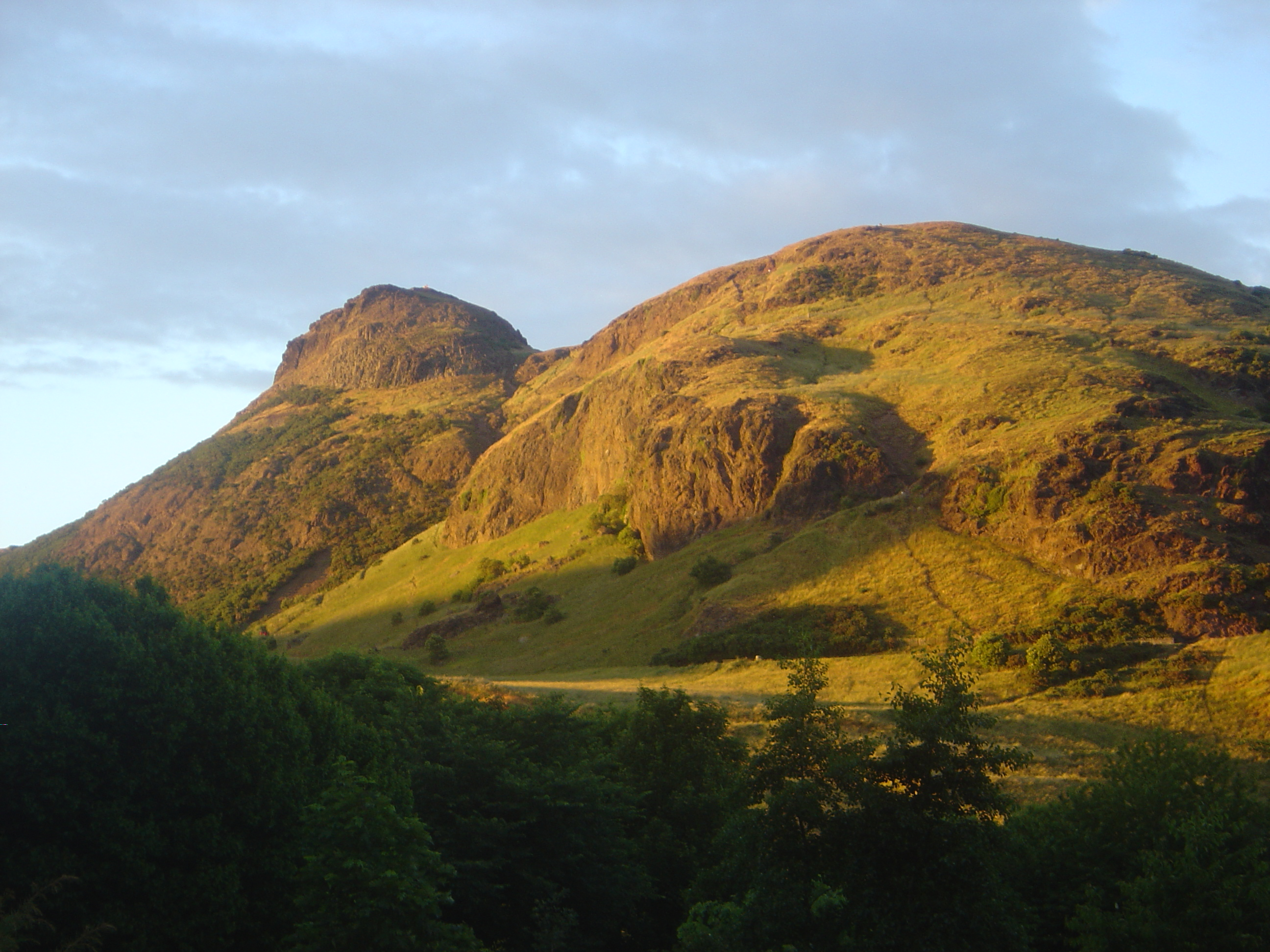
Arthur's Seat, the site of Henry James's 1856 experiment

The Schiehallion experiment was repeated in 1856 by Henry James, director-general of the Ordnance Survey, who instead used the hill Arthur's Seat in central Edinburgh. With the resources of the Ordnance Survey at his disposal, James extended his topographical survey to a 21-kilometre radius, taking him as far as the borders of Midlothian. He obtained a density of about 5,300 kg·m^{−3}.

An experiment in 2005 undertook a variation of the 1774 work: instead of computing local differences in the zenith, the experiment made a very accurate comparison of the period of a pendulum at the top and bottom of Schiehallion. The period of a pendulum is a function of g, the local gravitational acceleration. The pendulum is expected to run more slowly at altitude, but the mass of the mountain will act to reduce this difference. This experiment has the advantage of being considerably easier to conduct than the 1774 one, but to achieve the desired accuracy, it is necessary to measure the period of the pendulum to within one part in one million. This experiment yielded a value of the mass of the Earth of 8.1 ± 2.4 × 10^{24} kg, corresponding to a mean density of 7,500 ± 1,900 kg·m^{−3}. (Note: Taking the volume of the Earth to be 1.0832 × 10^{12} km^{3}.)

A modern re-examination of the geophysical data was able to take account of factors the 1774 team could not. With the benefit of a 120-km radius digital elevation model, greatly improved knowledge of the geology of Schiehallion, and the help of a computer, a 2007 report produced a mean Earth density of 5,480 ± 250 kg·m^{−3}. When compared to the modern figure of 5,515 kg·m^{−3}, it stood as a testament to the accuracy of Maskelyne's astronomical observations.

== Mathematical procedure ==
Schiehallion force diagram

Consider the force diagram to the right, in which the deflection has been greatly exaggerated. The analysis has been simplified by considering the attraction on only one side of the mountain. A plumb-bob of mass m is situated a distance d from P, the centre of mass of a mountain of mass M_{M} and density ρ_{M}. It is deflected through a small angle θ due to its attraction F towards P and its weight W directed towards the Earth. The vector sum of W and F results in a tension T in the pendulum string. The Earth has a mass M_{E}, radius r_{E} and a density ρ_{E}.

The two gravitational forces on the plumb-bob are given by Newton's law of gravitation:

$$F = \frac {G m M_M} {d^2} ,\quad W = \frac {G m M_E} {r_E^2}$$

where G is the Newtonian constant of gravitation. G and m can be eliminated by taking the ratio of F to W:

$$\frac {F} {W}
= \frac {G m M_M / d^2} {G m M_E / r_E^2}
= \frac {M_M}{M_E} \left( \frac {r_E}{d} \right)^2
= \frac {\rho_M} {\rho_E} \frac {V_M} {V_E} \left( \frac {r_E}{d} \right)^2$$

where V_{M} and V_{E} are the volumes of the mountain and the Earth. Under static equilibrium, the horizontal and vertical components of the string tension T can be related to the gravitational forces and the deflection angle θ:

$$W = T \cos \theta ,\quad F = T \sin \theta$$

Substituting for T:

$$\tan \theta
= \frac {F} {W}
= \frac {\rho_M}{\rho_E} \frac {V_M}{V_E} \left( \frac {r_E}{d} \right)^2$$

Since V_{E}, V_{M} and r_{E} are all known, θ has been measured and d has been computed, then a value for the ratio ρ_{E} : ρ_{M} can be obtained:

$$\frac {\rho_E}{\rho_M} = \frac {V_M}{V_E} \left( \frac {r_E}{d} \right)^2 \frac {1}{\tan \theta}$$
