= Tafazzul Husain Kashmiri =

18th-century Indian Shia Scholar

Khan-e-Allama Tafazzul Husain Kashmiri
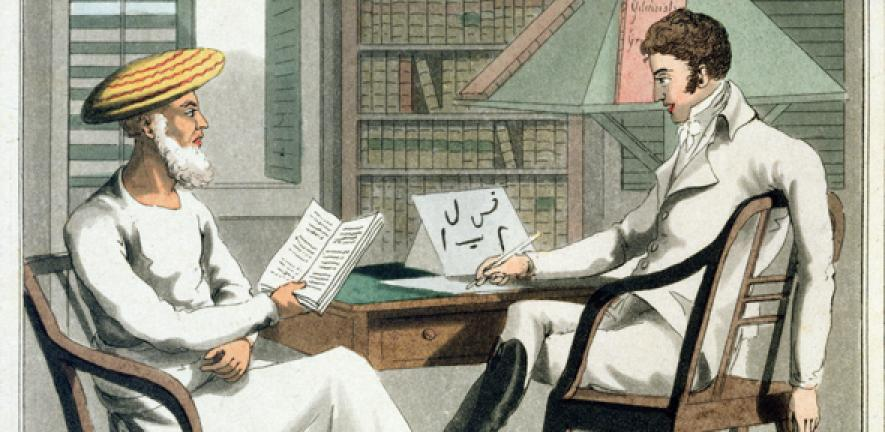
- Tafazzul Husain Kashmiri with James Dinwiddie
- Born: 1727 CE; Sialkot
- Died: 1801 CE; Lucknow
- Citizenship: Mughal Empire
- Education: Darul Uloom Firangi Mahal
- Scientific career
- Fields: Physics; Philosophy; Theology; Mathematics

Tafazzul Husain Khan Kashmiri (1727–1801) (Urdu: علامہ تفضل حسین کشمیری), also known as Khan-e-Allama, was a Twelver Shia scholar, physicist, and philosopher. He produced an Arabic translation of Sir Isaac Newton's Principia.

== Early life and education ==
Nawab Tafazzul Husain Kashmiri was born to a Kashmiri family in Sialkot in 1727. His grandfather, Karamullah, was a scholar who served as a minister under Moin-ul-Mulk, governor of Lahore. At the age of 13, his father moved to Delhi, where he studied basic logic and philosophy under Mulla Wajih . He learned Mathematics from Mirza Muhammad Ali. At the age of 18, his family moved to Lucknow where he joined the seminary of Firangi Mahal. Soon he developed doubts about the teachings of Sunni Islam and philosophy and moved out of the seminary, and started to research on his own. He then studied modern science and astronomy of his age. He had learned the philosophy of Mulla Sadra in Firangi Mahal, but moved on.

== Scholarly career ==
Shuja-ud-Daula appointed him tutor to his son Saadat Ali Khan II in Allahabad. There the then young Dildar Ali Naseerabadi, who later came to be known as Ghufran Maab, became his student.After the death of Nawab Shuja-ud-Daula his elder son Asaf-ud-Daula appointed Allama Tafazzul Hussain Khan Kashmiri as the Prime Minister of Awadh. In the time of Nawab Asaf-ud-Daula, Kashmiri was also appointed as an ambassador to the court of governor general of East India Company at Calcutta. Here he interacted with Reuben Burrow and James Dinwiddie. He learned Greek, Latin and English and started to translate scientific works of European scientists into Arabic to bridge the gap between the scientific revolution and the Muslim and Indian educational institutions. Science had flourished in the 18th century Europe due to public discussions in coffee houses, pubs, shops, fairs and other public places. By the end of eighteenth century CE, Calcutta had become a major center of cultural exchange where several scientific works, like James Ferguson's "Introduction to Electricity", Tiberius Cavallo's "A Complete Treatise on Electricity" and his "Essay on Theory and Practice of Medical Electricity", George Adams's "Essays on Electricity", Thomas Beddoes's "Factitious Airs", Jean-Antoine Chaptal's "Chemistry" and scholarly journals like the "Philosophical Magazine", were in circulation. The members of The Asiatic Society, founded by William Jones in 1784, held discussions on philosophy.

=== Works ===
He authored the following:

- Commentary on Conica of Appollonus.
- Two treatise on Algebra.
- Commentary on Conica of Diophantus.
- Translation of Sir Isaac Newton's Principia.
- A book on Physics.
- A book on Western Astronomy.

Some of these books were taught in Shia seminaries in the nineteenth century Lucknow. His successor, Saadat Ali Khan, founded an observatory in Lucknow. Ghazi-ud-Din Haidar Shah and Nasir-ud-Din Haidar Shah patronized modern scientific learning.

=== Collaboration with James Dinwiddie ===
James Dinwiddie first taught him Optics and then modern geometry. To his surprise, Tafazzul was struggling with mathematics. He remarked:

"It is somewhat irregular that a man who reads so much theory should be so totally ignorant of practical mathematics".

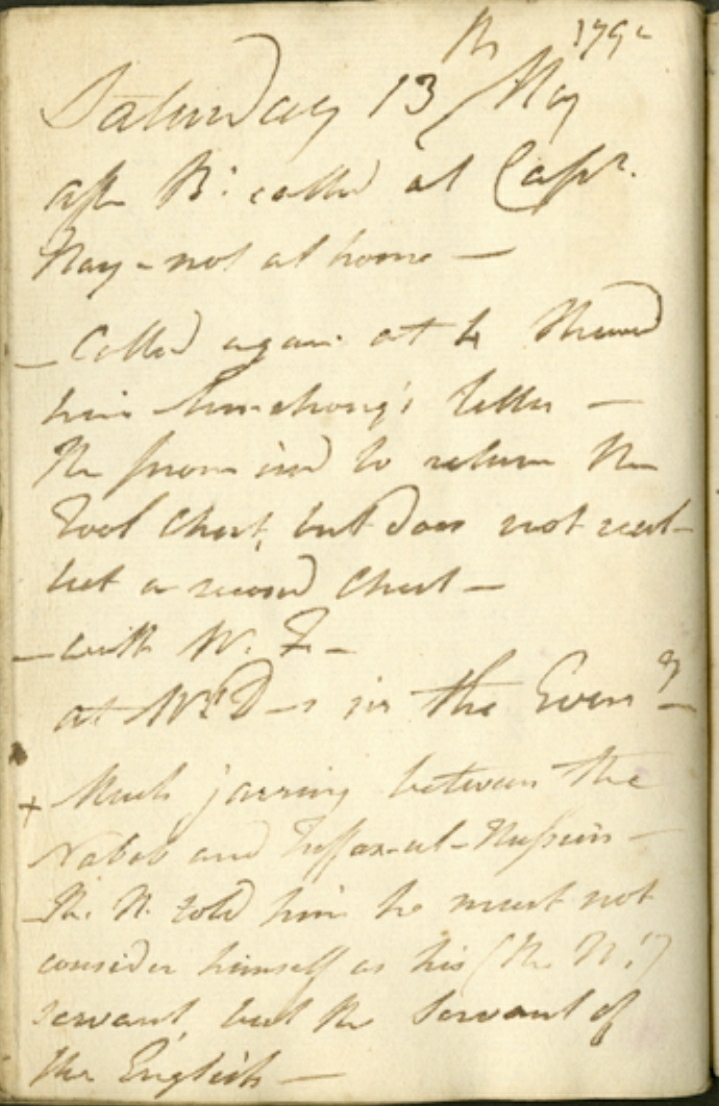
James Dinwiddie notes in his diary: "Much jarring between the Nabob and Tafazzul Husain - the N told him he must not consider himself as his (the N's) servant but the servant of the English." Dinwiddie Journal B 39–13 May 1797.

=== Opposition from Sunni orthodoxy ===
Shah Abdul Aziz, son of Shah Waliullah Dehlawi, considered him an apostate because of some of his views.

== Death ==
In 1799, he suffered a brain hemorrhage which left his body in a state of paralysis. He died travelling from Banaras to Lucknow on 3 March 1801. Mirza Abu Talib Khan wrote the following eulogy upon receiving the news of his death while in London:

"Alas! The zest of Learning's cup is gone;
Whose taste ne’er cloy’d, tho’ deep the draughts;
Whose flavor yet upon the palate hangs
Nectareous, nor Reason's thirst assuag’d
But yes; – rent is the garment of the morn;
And all dishevell’d floats the hair of night;
All bath’d in tears of dew the stars look down
With mournful eyes, in lamentation deep;
For he, their sage belov’d, is dead; who first
To Islam's followers explain’d their laws,
Their distances, their orbits, and their times,
As great Copernicus once half divin’d,
And greater Newton proved; but, useless now,
Their work we turn with idle hand, and scan
With vacant eye, our own first master gone."

== See also ==
- Reuben Burrow
- James Dinwiddie
- Shuja-ud-Daula
- Dildar Ali Naseerabadi
- Mirza Abu Talib Khan
- Sir Syed Ahmad Khan
- Pervez Hoodbhoy
