= Henry Watson (1737–1786) =

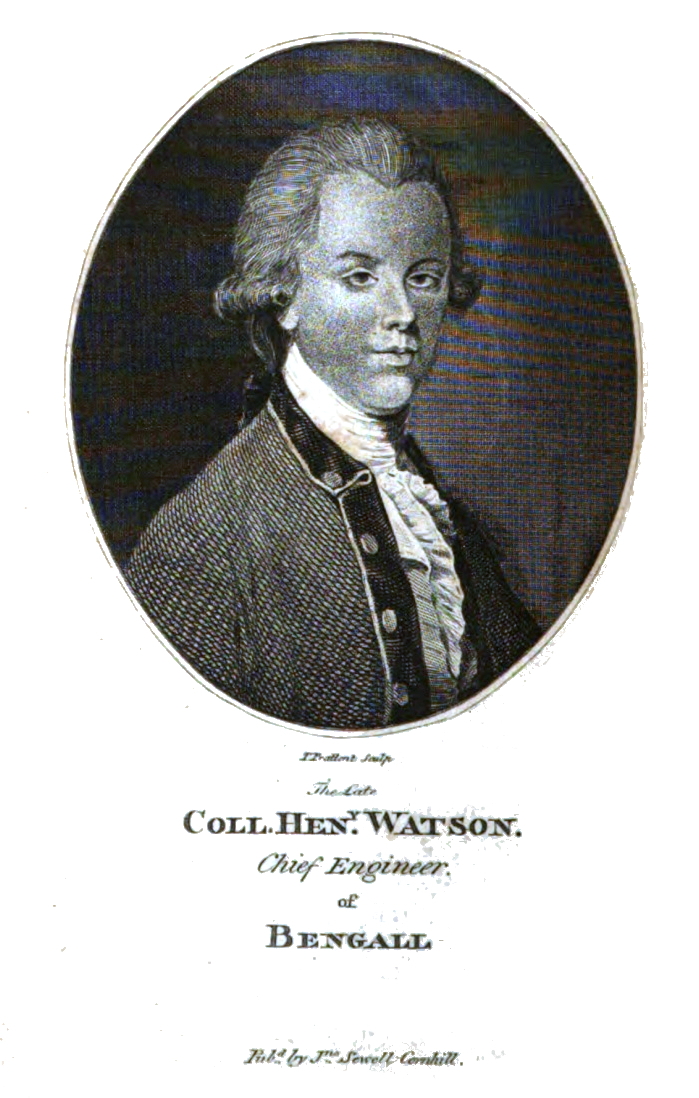
Portrait

Colonel Henry Watson (1737 – 17 September 1786) was an English military engineer who worked in India. He was known for his mathematical abilities and knowledge of engineering, was involved in the design of the Calcutta dockyard, and served as a chief engineer of Bengal. An area in Calcutta known as Watgunge is named after him.

Watson was the son of a grazier from Holbeach, Lincolnshire. He showed a talent for mathematics at Birke's school in Gosberton near Spalding. He was recommended to Thomas Whichcote of Harpeswell, MP for Lincolnshire, who had him tested by the master of Brigg school, following which he nominated Watson to the Royal Military Academy at Woolwich. He received training from Professor Thomas Simpson who became a close friend and contributed articles to The Ladies' Diary, a mathematical periodical.

Watson was commissioned on 27 December 1755 in the 52nd foot, Abercrombie's regiment. He transferred to the 50th foot, Studholme Hodgson's regiment, on 25 September 1757. Watson passed Woolwich Academy on 17 March 1759 and was commissioned as a sub-engineer.

Before Simpson died in 1760 he left his mathematical manuscripts with Watson to be revised and published. Watson was unable to do this; he was posted to Belleisle under Commodore Keppel and General Hodgson and then to Havana under Admiral Sir George Pocock.

Taking part in sieges and actions, Watson was promoted to 104th foot. On 4 February 1763 he was recommended by Lord Clive to be sent to India. He arrived in Calcutta in 1764, and was a field engineer in the East India Company from 9 May and chief engineer of Bengal. His works included improving Fort William, and works at Budge Budge and Melancholy Point. He designed and proposed dry and wet docks at Calcutta but this was not completed due to lack of funds. He had two warships, Nonsuch and Surprise, built by George Louch under his direction.

He became a lieutenant colonel in January 1775 and returned to England, where he translated Euler's Compleat Theory of the Construction and Properties of Vessels (1776).

He was recalled to India in 1780, and took along with him the mathematician Reuben Burrow. He also worked with James Creassy.

Watson's health declined. He resigned in January 1786 and left India in the spring. He reached Dover, but died there, and was buried on 22 September in a vault in St. Mary's Church there.
