= Dinwiddie =

Dinwiddie may refer to:

- Ettleton, a village in the Scottish Borders
- Dinwiddie County, Virginia, a county in Virginia, United States
  - Dinwiddie, Virginia, the county seat of Dinwiddie County
- Fort Dinwiddie (1755–1789), a fort for the Virginia Militia during the French and Indian War and Revolutionary War
- Dinwiddie (surname)

== See also ==
- Dinwoodie (disambiguation)
