= Dinwoodey =

Dinwoodey is a surname. Notable people with the surname include:

- Annette Richardson Dinwoodey (1906–2007), American radio singer
- Dean Dinwoodey (1899–1983), American Mormon missionary

== See also ==
- Dinwoodie (disambiguation)
