= Carlo Ignazio Giulio =

Italian mathematician and mechanical engineer

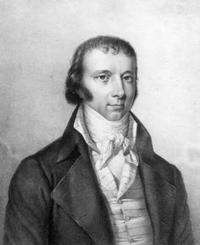
- Born: 11 August 1803; Turin, Italy
- Died: 29 June 1859 (aged 55); Turin, Italy
- Occupations: Professor and politician
- Years active: 1828–1859
- Employer: University of Turin

Carlo Ignazio Giulio (11 August 1803 – 29 June 1859) was an Italian mathematician, mechanical engineer and politician.

== Bibliography ==
- Giulio, Carlo Ignazio (1846). Quattro lezioni sul sistema metrico decimale dette da C.I. Giulio nella scuola di meccanica applicata alle arti le sere delli 20, 25, 27 e 30 giugno 1846 (in Italian). Presso G. Pomba E C. Editori.
- Sunti delle lezioni di meccanica applicata alle arti (in Italian). Torino: Pomba. 1846.
- Giulio, Carlo Ignazio (1854). Elementi di cinematica applicata alle arti esposti da C.I. Giulio: ad uso delle scuole universitarie, speciali e tecniche, e degli ingegneri, capi di officine e macchinisti (in Italian). Stamperia reale.
