= Robert Waddington (mathematician) =

Mathematician, astronomer and teacher of navigation

Robert Waddington (died 1779) was a mathematician, astronomer and teacher of navigation. He is best known as one of the observers appointed by the Royal Society to observe the 1761 transit of Venus with Nevil Maskelyne on the island of Saint Helena. On that voyage they made successful use of the lunar-distance method of establishing longitude at sea. Waddington subsequently taught the method at his academy in London and published a navigation manual, A Practical Method for Finding the Longitude and Latitude of a Ship at Sea, by Observations of the Moon (1763).

== Life before 1761 ==
Little is known about Waddington's early life, although he was probably the "Mr. Rob. Waddington of Hull" who appeared in The Gentleman's Diary or The Mathematical Repository in 1758 and Benjamin Martin's General Magazine of Arts and Sciences in 1759. The papers of the gentleman astronomer Nathaniel Pigott show that Waddington was living in his household, in Whitton, Middlesex, immediately before his appointment as an observer by the Royal Society. It is from these manuscripts that we have a detailed knowledge of Waddington's experience of the Saint Helena expedition and his subsequent attempts to forge a career as a teacher, mathematical practitioner and longitude projector.

== Voyage to Saint Helena ==
In 1760 Waddington was appointed by the Royal Society to accompany Nevil Maskelyne on a voyage to Saint Helena as one of two expeditions being organised by the Society, and paid for by George II, to observe the 1761 Transit of Venus. The expedition's equipment was ordered by Maskelyne and the Society arranged transport from the East India Company. The Directors of the East India Company in London wrote to The Governor of St Helena on 31 December 1760 to inform them that "Revd. Mr. Nevil Maskelyne and Mr. Robert Waddington take passage on the Prince Henry to St. Helena. As this is done to make some improvements in Astronomy which will be of general utility the two last named gentlemen are upon their arrival and during their stay to be accommodated by you in a suitable manner with diet and apartments at the Company's expense and you are to give them all the assistance as to materials, workmen, and whatsoever else the service they are employed upon may require." The reply confirmed their readiness to help and stated "We have already erected an observatory for them in the country".

In the event, Waddington and Maskelyne's view of the transit of Venus on 6 July 1761 was thwarted by clouds. However, the voyages to and from the island proved to be very significant to the subsequent careers of both men as they used it to make longitude determinations by the lunar-distance method testing the accuracy of lunar tables calculated by Tobias Mayer. Maskelyne's log of the voyage records their efforts to do this, with the assistance of officers from the ship, and refers to the use of "Mr Waddington's Quadrant", a Hadley's quadrant adapted by him to better facilitate lunar-distance observations Waddington kept his own account of the voyages, and seems to have produced more accurate observations than Maskelyne. He told Piggott that their observations "finds a Practical & Certain Method" of determining longitude "& may be depended upon to one Degree of Longitude". This wording and degree of accuracy echoes that in the 1714 Longitude Act, which offered a reward of £10,000 for methods that kept or found longitude to within a degree.

== Subsequent career ==
Waddington returned from Saint Helena before Maskelyne, who stayed on to attempt observations of the parallax of Sirius. He arrived back in London on 21 September 1761 and began to forge a career around providing teaching and texts on navigation, particularly the lunar-distance method of finding longitude. Waddington, having announced publicly by his method longitude "may be generally obtained to less than half a Degree, and always to less than One Degree", hoped that he might be in a position to receive a reward from the Board of Longitude. His contribution was a method of observing and computing the data, but was based on Mayer's lunar tables and the earlier publication of precomputed tables and rules by Nicolas-Louis de Lacaille. His 1763 Practical Method for Finding the Longitude included such instructions and tables, which he claimed would reduce the necessary computation from several hours to three-quarters of an hour. Maskelyne, on his return to London, produced his own version of such a text in the same year, The British Mariner's Guide, although never seems to have expected a reward from the Board of Longitude for his effort.

Waddington styled himself "Teacher of Mathematics at the Mathematical Academy in Three Tun-court, Mile's-lane, London", where he taught officers of the East India Company and also sold Hadley's quadrants. In 1763 he attempted, unsuccessfully, to gain employment from the Royal Society. By 1764 he had moved to Rolls Building, Chancery Lane. He reported to Piggott his hopes that he and Maskelyne might gain the interest of the Board of Longitude but his only formal approach to them seems to have been in 1771, when a petition was read at a meeting on 11 May stating that he had much improved, and successfully trialled, the steering compass, or binnacle.

In 1777 he published his longest and most comprehensive work, An Epitome of Theoretical and Practical Navigation. As The Edinburgh Magazine reported in 1778, he claimed that the book could "teach the young navigator every particular essential to his art, without his being under the necessity of having recourse to any other author."

Waddington's will, dated 12 May 1775 and proved posthumously in 1779, states his address as Downing Street, Westminster. His wife, Margaret, was the beneficiary.
