= Michael Dinwiddie =

American playwright (1954–2025)

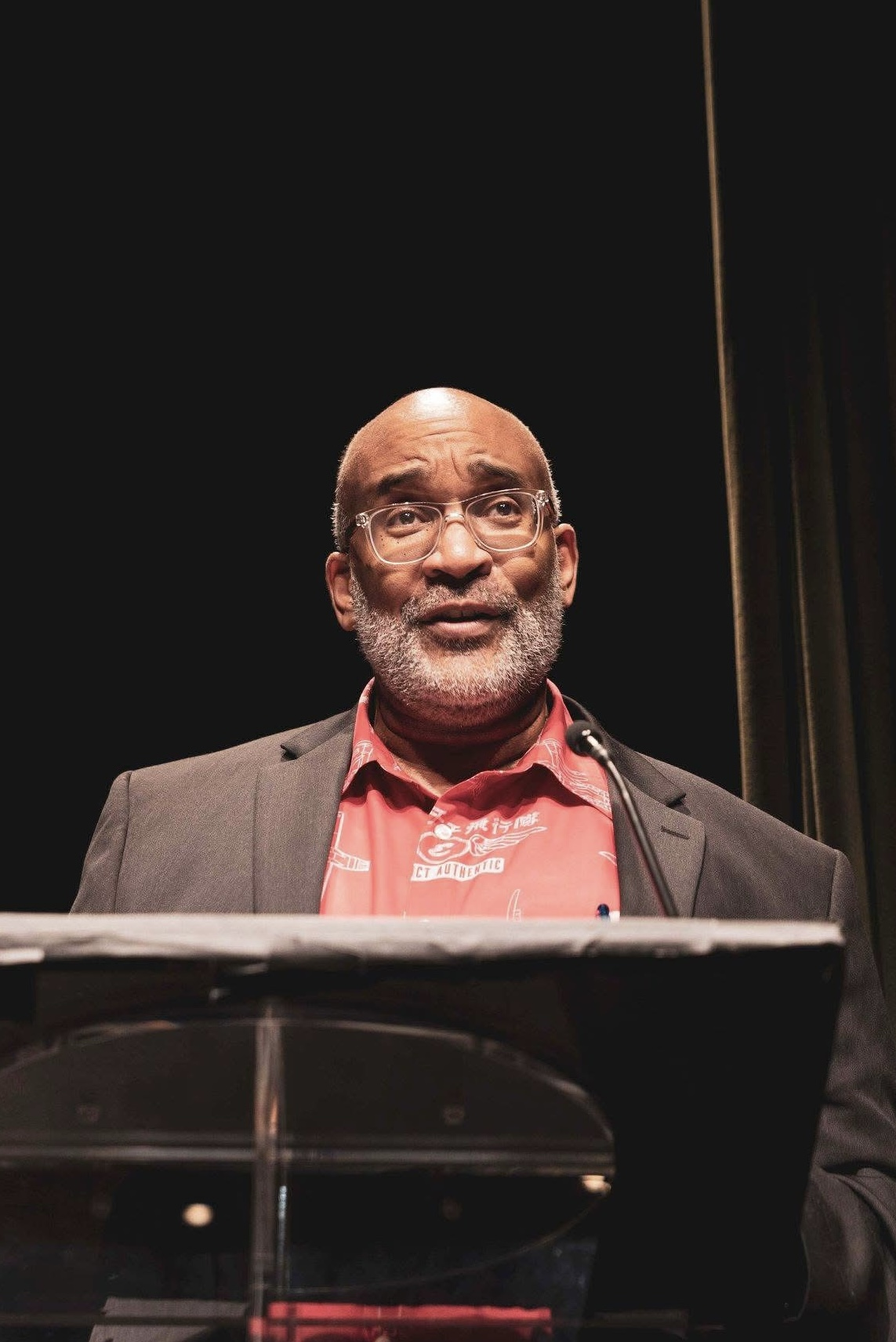
- Dinwiddie in 2019
- Born: December 13, 1954; Muskogee, Oklahoma, U.S.
- Died: July 4, 2025 (aged 70); New York City, U.S.
- Occupations: Professor; dramatist; composer; scholar; writer

Michael D. Dinwiddie (December 13, 1954 – July 4, 2025) was an American playwright, academic, composer and scholar of Black theater. In addition to his own work and contribution to Black literature and theatre, he led major efforts which led to New York University commemorating the African Grove Theater as part of a new building opening in 2023.

== Life and career ==
Born on December 13, 1954, in Muskogee, Oklahoma, as a self-described “Okie from Muskogee,” Dinwiddie was among the early graduates of New York University’s experimental college of interdisciplinary studies, which would later become the Gallatin School of Individualized Study.

Dinwiddie returned to NYU to join the Gallatin faculty and is credited with playing a key role in the university’s expansion into a global institution. He taught courses at NYU’s international campuses in Abu Dhabi, Accra, and Buenos Aires. In 2022, The New York Times recognized his leadership in memorializing the African Grove Theatre—the first Black theatre in the United States, established in 1821—by helping to name a new theater at NYU in its honor.

Dinwiddie's works, often centered on historical Black cultural figures such as Langston Hughes and Eubie Blake, were produced at leading Black theatre companies across the United States. His accolades include:

- Fellowship in playwriting from the National Endowment for the Arts (1995)
- Investiture in the College of Fellows of the American Theatre (2018)
- Recognition by the California State Legislature (2011) and the Detroit City Council (2022)
- The 2024 AUDELCO Torchbearer Pioneer Award for his contributions to Black performing arts communities
- President of the August Wilson Society

Dinwiddie died following a brief illness in New York City, on July 4, 2025. Syncopated Stages, an exhibit at New York Public Library's Library for the Performing Arts which Dinwiddie was curating opened on September 17, 2025.

Dinwiddie was survived by his husband, Vincent H. Parham Jr. and extended family.

== Works ==
=== Fiction ===
- Invisible Life
- Holy Ground

=== Plays ===
- The Beautiful LaSalles (1990), produced by the Crossroads Theater Company, New Brunswick, New Jersey.
- Northern Lights 1966 (2018), at the Mosaic Youth Theatre in Detroit, Michigan in May 2018.
- The Carelessness of Love (2018), a staged reading was directed by Clinton Turner Davis and produced by Woodie King at the Castillo Theatre, New York, on 23 June 2018.
- Actuary (2018), one-act play directed by Kristi Papaille in Louisville, Kentucky, in November 2018.
- Poppyseed (2021), a 10-minute play, part of the Metropolitan Playhouse series “East Side Stories Unmasked: Welcome to the Neighborhood.”

=== Nonfiction ===
- Dinwiddie, Michael. “African Grove Theatre’s Radical Roots.” Black Masks, vol. 27, no. 2, 2021, pp. 14–14.
- Dinwiddie, Michael. “Black Panther Meets Pink Panther” in Madhubuti, Haki R., and Herb Boyd, editors. Black Panther : Paradigm Shift or Not?: A Collection of Reviews and Essays on a Blockbuster Film. Third World Press Foundation, 2019.
- Dinwiddie, Michael, editor (2022). Holy ground : the National Black Theatre Festival anthology. Theatre Communications Group.
- Dinwiddie, Michael. "World War I: The Harlem HellFighters” in Kraaz, Sarah Mahler, editor. Music and War in the United States. Routledge, 2019.
