= Hermann Masius =

German educator (1818–1893)

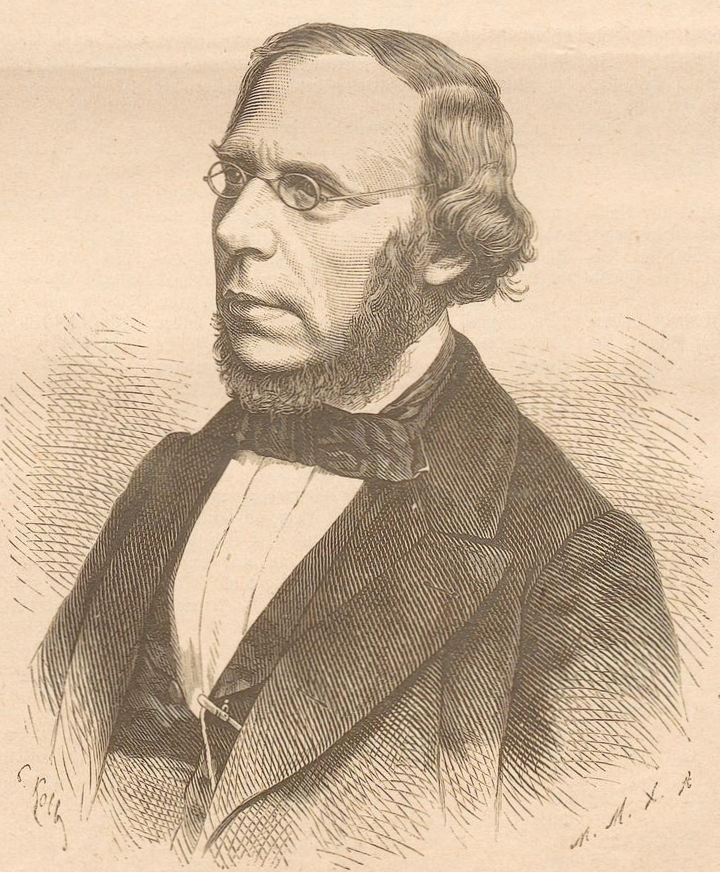
Hermann Masius

Hermann Masius (7 January 1818 – 22 May 1893) was a German educator who was a native of Trebnitz (today a borough of Könnern).

He studied theology in Halle, and later was director of a gymnasium in Halberstadt. In 1860 he became director of a Realschule in Dresden, and in 1862 was appointed professor of pedagogy and director of the educational seminar at the University of Leipzig, the first to hold that position.

Among his numerous publications was a popular work on Naturstudien ("Nature Studies", 1st ed. 1852). It was published over several editions, and acclaimed for its blending of natural and cultural history from an aesthetic standpoint. He collaborated with other academic professionals in the survey volume Die gesamten Naturwissenschaften ("Complete Natural Sciences").

As a child, Franz Boas loved to read Mazius's books, including because "you can learn Latin, Greek, Italian and other languages from the footnotes."
