= Dunwoody (surname) =

Dunwoody is a surname. Notable people with the surname include:

- Ann E. Dunwoody (born 1953), U.S. Army officer, first female four-star general in the United States military
- Gwyneth Dunwoody (1930–2008), British Labour politician
- John Dunwoody (1929–2006), British Labour politician and husband to Gwyneth Dunwoody
- Martin Dunwoody (born 1938), mathematician
- Richard Dunwoody (born 1964), Northern Irish jockey
- Tamsin Dunwoody (born 1958), British Labour politician and daughter to John and Gwyneth Dunwoody
- William Hood Dunwoody (1841–1914), American businessman

== Fictional ==
- Benson Dunwoody, from the television series Regular Show
