= Hubert Dinwoodie =

Recipient of the George Cross

- Born: 24 March 1896; Bournemouth, England
- Died: 28 August 1968 (aged 72); Bournemouth, England
- Military career
- Allegiance: United Kingdom
- Branch: British Army; Royal Air Force
- Service years: 1915–1920; 1939–1954
- Rank: Wing commander
- Service number: 72819
- Units: Dorset Regiment (1915–1920); BEF 10/20 Squadron (1918–1919); RAFVR (Technical Branch) (1939–1954)
- Conflicts: First World War; Second World War
- Awards: George Cross; Officer of the Order of the British Empire; Military Cross

Wing Commander Hubert Dinwoodie, GC, OBE, MC (24 March 1896 – 28 August 1968) was an officer in the Royal Air Force and a recipient of the George Cross shortly after the end of the Second World War for defusing bombs in Germany in 1946.

== First World War ==
Dinwoodie was commissioned a second lieutenant (on probation) in the 3rd Battalion of the Dorset Regiment on 8 June 1915, and following training was confirmed in his rank on 14 December. He was seconded to the 1/76th Trench Mortar Battery on 6 April 1916.

During the First World War he won the Military Cross (MC) in May 1916 while attached to the 1/76th Trench Mortar Battery:

2nd. Lt. Hubert Dinwoodie, 3rd Battalion Dorset Regiment (attached. 1/76th Trench Mortar Battery) For conspicuous gallantry. During an attack by the enemy, although his gun emplacement was destroyed by a shell and the gun partially buried, he immediately got it into action again, and, after firing till his ammunition was exhausted, removed the gun into safety. He then, though partly incapacitated, led parties with ammunition and bombs up to the firing line.

Dinwoodie was promoted to the temporary rank of lieutenant on 9 June 1916, and to the acting rank of captain on 15 October. He was appointed an assistant instructor at a trench mortar school on 7 November, with the acting rank of captain, and relinquished his temporary lieutenancy on 8 November. He was promoted to the permanent rank of lieutenant on 1 July 1917.

He became an observer in the RAF on 19 September 1918, joining BEF/20 squadron on 26 September with the rank of second lieutenant (honorary lieutenant). On 6 October he and his pilot were flying Bristol Fighter, serial A2402, when they were shot down; Dinwoodie was badly wounded. He continued in service as a trench mortar instructor, and was transferred to the unemployed list and relinquished his acting rank of captain on 11 June 1919. Dinwoodie was demobilised on 1 April 1920, and left the service retaining the rank of captain.

== Second World War ==
Dinwoodie was commissioned a pilot officer (on probation) in the RAFVR on 28 March 1939. He was confirmed in his rank and promoted to flying officer on 28 August 1939, and was promoted to flight lieutenant (war substantive) on 16 May 1941. As an acting squadron leader, Dinwoodie was appointed an Officer of the Order of the British Empire, Military Division (OBE) in the 1942 Birthday Honours list. He was promoted to temporary squadron leader on 1 January 1943.

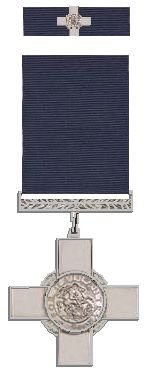
George Cross and its ribbon bar

=== George Cross ===
On 20 August 1946, German high explosive bombs were being loaded onto barges for disposal at sea when a 50 kilograms (110 lb) bomb was dropped and exploded, killing six and injuring 12. Two train loads of bombs were ready for loading and the port area, in the centre of Lübeck, was evacuated. Squadron Leader Dinwoodie (while on attachment to the 5140 (Bomb Disposal) Squadron, Royal Air Force Volunteer Reserve) and Corporal Roland Garred were sent to the scene and defused one of the remaining bombs in the batch to discover that a faulty fuse had caused the accident. They rendered the remaining 11 bombs safe when another explosion would have not only killed them but set off the bomb laden trains and devastated the town centre. Leading Aircraftman John Hatton, the driver in the bomb disposal team, also assisted in moving the bombs.

Awarded the George Cross on 4 February 1947, the citation in the London Gazette praised Dinwoodie for displaying

...cold-blooded heroism and initiative in extremely critical circumstances. He was ably assisted by Corporal Garred who showed courage and devotion to duty of a very high order. Although both were aware that they were in great personal danger, they completed a task which probably averted a serious disaster to the port of Lubeck.

Garred was awarded the George Medal, while Hatton received the British Empire Medal.

Dinwoodie relinquished his commission in the RAFVR with effect from 10 February 1954, retaining the rank of wing commander. His medals and some photographs are held by the RAF Museum at Hendon, London.
