= Charles Hutton =

British mathematician and surveyor (1737–1823)

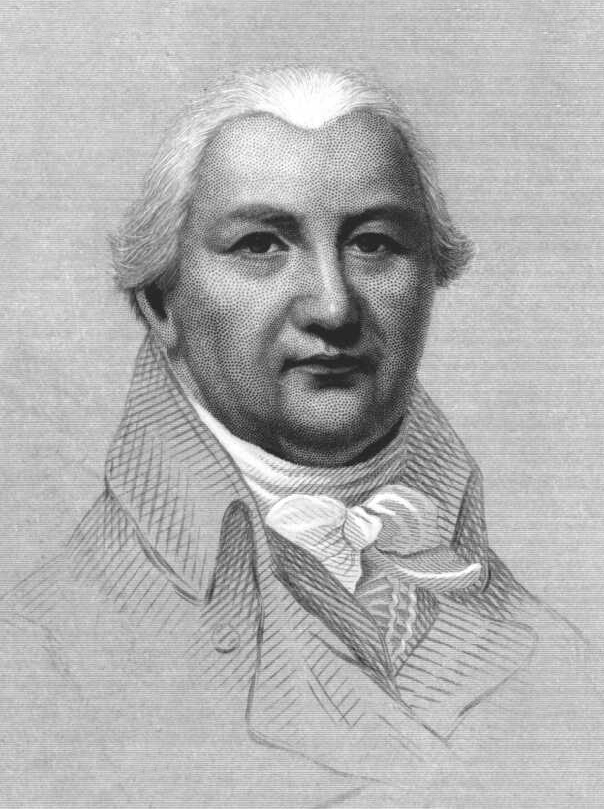
- Born: 14 August 1737; Newcastle upon Tyne, England
- Died: 27 January 1823 (aged 85); London, England
- Awards: Copley Medal 1778
- Scientific career
- Fields: mathematics
- Workplaces: Royal Military Academy

Charles Hutton FRS FRSE LLD (14 August 1737 – 27 January 1823) was an English mathematician and surveyor. He was professor of mathematics at the Royal Military Academy, Woolwich from 1773 to 1807. He is remembered for his calculation of the density of the Earth from Nevil Maskelyne's measurements collected during the Schiehallion experiment.

== Life ==
Hutton was born on Percy Street in Newcastle upon Tyne in the north of England, the son of a superintendent of mines, who died when he was still very young. He was educated at a school at Jesmond, kept by Mr Ivison, an Anglican clergyman. There is reason to believe, on the evidence of two pay-bills, that for a short time in 1755 and 1756 Hutton worked in the colliery at Old Long Benton. Following Ivison's promotion to a church living, Hutton took over the Jesmond school, which, in consequence of his increasing number of pupils, he relocated to nearby Stotes Hall, since demolished. While he taught during the day at Stotes Hall, which overlooked Jesmond Dene, he studied mathematics in the evening at a school in Newcastle. In 1760 he married, and began teaching on a larger scale in Newcastle, where his pupils included John Scott, later Lord Eldon, who became Lord High Chancellor of Great Britain.

In 1764 Hutton published his first work, The Schoolmasters Guide, or a Complete System of Practical Arithmetic, which was followed by his Treatise on Mensuration both in Theory and Practice in 1770. At around this time he was employed by the mayor and corporation of Newcastle to make a survey of the town and its environs. He drew up a map for the corporation; a smaller one, of the town only, was engraved and published. In 1772 he brought out a tract on The Principles of Bridges, a subject suggested by the destruction of the sole Newcastle bridge by the Great Flood of 1771.

Hutton left Newcastle in 1773, following his appointment as professor of mathematics at the Royal Military Academy, Woolwich. He was elected a Fellow of the Royal Society in July, 1774 He was asked by the society to perform the calculations necessary to work out the mass and density of the Earth from the results of the Schiehallion experiment – a set of observations of the gravitational pull of a mountain in Perthshire made by the Astronomer Royal, Nevil Maskelyne, in 1774–76. Hutton's results appeared in the society's Philosophical Transactions for 1778, and were later reprinted in the second volume of Hutton's Tracts on Mathematical and Philosophical Subjects. His work on the question procured for him the degree of LL.D. from the University of Edinburgh. He became the foreign secretary of the Royal Society in 1779. His resignation from the society in 1783 was brought about by tensions between its president Sir Joseph Banks and the mathematicians amongst its members. He was elected a Foreign Honorary Member of the American Academy of Arts and Sciences in 1788.

While working on the Schiehallion experiment, Hutton recorded 23 Gaelic place-names on or near his measurement contour. Less than half are to be found on the modern Ordnance Survey map.

After his Tables of the Products and Powers of Numbers, 1781, and his Mathematical Tables of 1785 (second edition 1794), Hutton issued, for the use of the Royal Military Academy, in 1787 Elements of Conic Sections, and in 1798 his Course of Mathematics. His Mathematical and Philosophical Dictionary, a valuable contribution to scientific biography, was published in 1795 and the four volumes of Recreations in Mathematics and Natural Philosophy, mostly translated from the French, in 1803. One of his most laborious works was the abridgment, in conjunction with G. Shaw and R. Pearson, of the Royal Society's Philosophical Transactions. This undertaking, the mathematical and scientific parts of which fell to Hutton, was completed in 1809, and filled 18 quarto volumes. From 1764 he contributed to The Ladies' Diary (a poetical and mathematical almanac established in 1704), and became its editor in 1773–4, retaining the post until 1817. He had previously begun a small periodical called Miscellane Mathematica, of which only 13 numbers appeared; he subsequently published five volumes of The Diarian Miscellany which contained substantial extracts from the Diary.

Due to ill health, Hutton resigned his professorship in 1807, although he served as the principal examiner of the Royal Military Academy, and also to the Addiscombe Military Seminary for some years after his retirement. The Board of Ordnance had granted him a pension of £500 a year. During his last years, he worked on new editions of his earlier works.

He died on 27 January 1823, and was buried in the family vault at Charlton, in Kent.

During the last year of his life a group of his friends set up a fund to pay to have a marble bust made of him. It was executed by the sculptor Sebastian Gahagan. The subscription exceeded the amount necessary, and a medal was also produced, engraved by Benjamin Wyon, showing Hutton's head on one side and emblems representing his discoveries about the force of gunpowder, and the density of the Earth on the other.

== Sources ==
- Bruce, John (1823). A Memoir of Charles Hutton LLD FRS. Newcastle.
- Wardhaugh, Benjamin (2019). Gunpowder & Geometry. The Life of Charles Hutton: Pit Boy, Mathematician and Scientific Rebel. London: William Collins.

== Works ==
- A mathematical and philosophical dictionary Vol. I London : Printed by J. Davis for J. Johnson and G. G. and J. Robinson 1795 at Internet Archive
- A mathematical and philosophical dictionary Vol. II London : Printed by J. Davis for J. Johnson and G. G. and J. Robinson 1795 at Internet Archive
- A mathematical and philosophical dictionary Vols. I and II London : Printed by J. Davis for J. Johnson and G. G. and J. Robinson 1795 at the Archimedes Project
- A mathematical and philosophical dictionary Vol. I London, Printed for the author [etc.] 1815 at Internet Archive
- A mathematical and philosophical dictionary Vol. II London, Printed for the author [etc.] 1815 at Google Books
- Charles Hutton Tracts on Mathematical and Philosophical Subjects (F. & C. Rivington, London, 1812)
- Charles Hutton A Course of Mathematics For the Use of Academies... (volume 1) (Campbell & sons, New York, 1825)
- Charles Hutton A Course of Mathematics For the Use of Academies... (volume 2) (Dean, New York, 1831)
- Charles Hutton A Treatise on Mensuration both in Theory and in practice (Newcastle upon Tyne, 1770)
- Charles Hutton Mathematical tables (F. & C. Rivington, London, 1811)
