= James Dinwiddie (surgeon) =

Captain James Cuthbert 'Cuddy' Dinwiddie, known also as "Doctor Dinwiddie," was a Confederate military surgeon who inadvertently advanced the treatment against microorganisms and infections during his service as a battlefield surgeon during the American Civil War.

During this period, the army doctors on both sides were greatly handicapped as microorganisms weren't well understood and the germ theory of disease and antibiotics were still a few years away. Many soldiers died from infections that modern medicine would now be able to easily treat.

== Angel's Glow ==
Captain Dinwiddie had witnessed the carnage of the Battle of Shiloh and was greatly interested by the increased survival on those wounded soldiers that exhibited "Angels Glow". Angels Glow was caused by the then unknown bioluminescent bacteria Photorhabdus luminescens. It has been reported that infection by this bacterium of the wounds of soldiers in the Civil War caused the wounds to glow, and that this aided the survival of the soldiers due to the production of antibiotics by P. luminescens. This led to the phenomenon's nickname "Angel's Glow."

== Effective method despite flawed model ==
After his observations of the unexplained impact of angels glow, Dinwiddie's erroneous conclusion was that mortification (now called gangrene or necrosis) was caused by "dark humors" or "bad air" (miasma theory) that had contacted his surgical instruments, clothing and bedding, and moreover, these dark humors could be eradicated by heat and noise. Based on his flawed idea Dr. Dinwiddie began a daily practice of placing his surgical bedding and instruments into a large pot of boiling pine tea. When the steam (in his mind the 'dark humors' or 'bad air') came to the surface, he would ring a cow bell to frighten them away. Dr. Dinwiddie's infection rates plummeted.

While his model of induced bacterial necrosis was flawed, his practice greatly reduced mortality amongst his patients, as boiling the tools and bedsheets served to kill germs, functioning as a basic form of sterilization.
