= Nevil Maskelyne =

British astronomer and physicist (1732–1811)

Nevil Maskelyne FRS FRSE
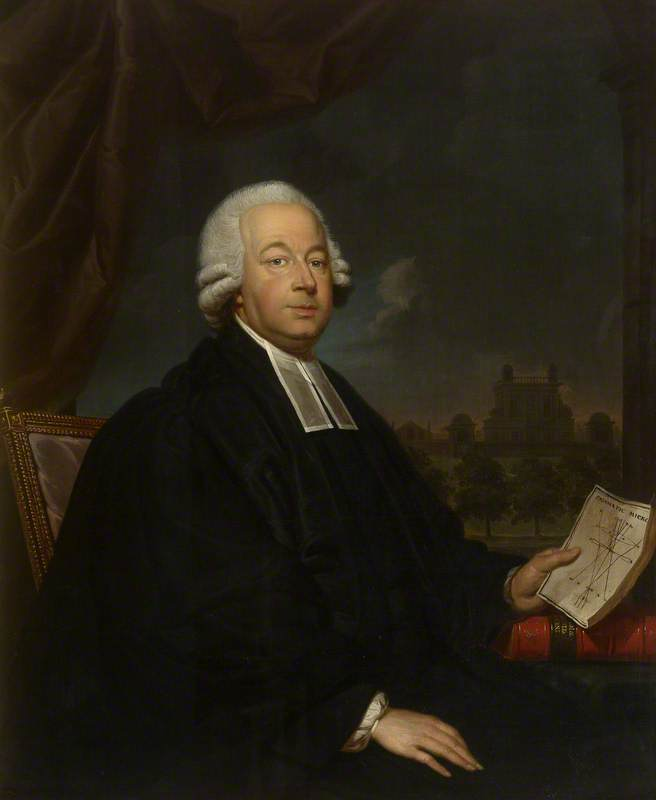
- Portrait by Louis François Gerard van der Puyl, 1785
- Born: 6 October 1732; London, England
- Died: 9 February 1811; Greenwich, Kent, England
- Title: Astronomer Royal
- Awards: Royal Society Copley Medal (1775)
- Scientific career
- Fields: Astronomy
- Workplaces: Fellow of the Royal Society (1758); Fellow of the Royal Society of Edinburgh (1784); Honorary Member of the French Institute

5th Astronomer Royal
- In office 1765–1811
- Preceded by: Nathaniel Bliss
- Succeeded by: John Pond

Nevil Maskelyne (/ˈmæskəlɪn/; 6 October 1732 – 9 February 1811) was the fifth British Astronomer Royal. (Note: Dates before 14 September 1752 are in the Julian calendar, which was in force in the UK at that time.) He held the office from 1765 to 1811. He was the first person to scientifically measure the mass of the planet Earth. He created The Nautical Almanac, in full the British Nautical Almanac and Astronomical Ephemeris for the Meridian of the Royal Observatory at Greenwich, using Tobias Mayer's corrections for Leonhard Euler's Lunar Theory tables.

== Biography ==
Maskelyne was born in London, the third son of Edmund Maskelyne of Purton in Wiltshire, and his wife, Elizabeth Booth. Maskelyne's father died when he was 12, leaving the family in reduced circumstances. Maskelyne attended Westminster School and was still a pupil there when his mother died in 1748. His interest in astronomy had begun while at Westminster School, shortly after the eclipse of 14 July 1748.

Maskelyne entered St Catharine's College, Cambridge, in 1749, graduating as seventh wrangler in 1754. Ordained as a minister in 1755, he became a fellow of Trinity College, Cambridge in 1756 and a Fellow of the Royal Society in 1758. Maskelyne became a member of the American Philosophical Society, elected in 1771.

Originally pursuing his career as a Church of England minister, he was Rector of Shrawardine in Shropshire from 1775 to 1782 and then Rector of North Runcton in Norfolk from 1782. In 1784 he was elected a Fellow of the Royal Society of Edinburgh. His proposers were John Playfair, John Robison and Dugald Stewart. On 21 August 1784 Maskelyne married Sophia Rose, then of St Andrew Holborn, Middlesex. Their only child, Margaret (25 June 1785–1858), was the mother of Mervyn Herbert Nevil Story-Maskelyne (1823–1911) professor of mineralogy at Oxford (1856–95). Maskelyne's younger sister, Margaret, married Robert Clive.

Maskelyne is buried in the churchyard of St Mary the Virgin, the parish church of the village of Purton, Wiltshire, England.

== Career ==
=== Measurement of longitude ===
In 1760 the Royal Society appointed Maskelyne as an astronomer on one of their expeditions to observe the 1761 transit of Venus. He and the mathematician Robert Waddington were sent to the island of Saint Helena in the South Atlantic. This was an important observation since accurate measurements would allow the accurate calculation of Earth's distance from the Sun, which would in turn allow the actual rather than the relative scale of the Solar System to be calculated. This would allow, it was argued, the production of more accurate astronomical tables, in particular those predicting the motion of the Moon.

Bad weather prevented observation of the transit, but Maskelyne used his journey to trial a method of determining longitude using the position of the moon, which became known as the lunar distance method. He returned to England, resuming his position as curate at Chipping Barnet in 1761, and began work on a book, publishing the lunar-distance method of longitude calculation and providing tables to facilitate its use in 1763 in The British Mariner's Guide, which included the suggestion that to facilitate the finding of longitude at sea, lunar distances should be calculated beforehand for each year and published in a form accessible to navigators.

In 1763 the Board of Longitude sent Maskelyne to Barbados in order to carry out an official trial of three contenders for a Longitude reward. He was to carry out observations on board ship and to calculate the longitude of the capital, Bridgetown by observation of Jupiter's satellites. The three methods on trial were John Harrison's sea watch (now known as H4), Tobias Mayer's lunar tables and a marine chair made by Christopher Irwin, intended to help observations of Jupiter's satellites on board ship. Both Harrison's watch and lunar-distance observations based on Mayer's lunar tables produced results within the terms of the Longitude Act, although the former appeared to be more accurate. Harrison's watch had produced Bridgetown's longitude with an error of less than ten miles, while the lunar-distance observations were accurate to within 30 nautical miles.

Maskelyne reported the results of the trial to the Board of Longitude on 9 February 1765. On 26 February 1765 he had been appointed Astronomer Royal following the unexpected death of Nathaniel Bliss in 1764; making him ex officio a Commissioner of Longitude. The Commissioners understood that the timekeeping and astronomical methods of finding longitude were complementary. The lunar-distance method could more quickly be rolled out, with Maskelyne's proposal that tables like those in his "The British Mariner's Guide" be published for each year. This proposal led to the establishment of The Nautical Almanac, the production of which, as Astronomer Royal, Maskelyne oversaw. Taking even occasional astronomical observations was also the only way to check that a timekeeper was keeping good time over the course of a long voyage. The Commissioners also needed to know that more than one sea watch could be made, and that Harrison's methods could be communicated to other watchmakers.

The Board of Longitude therefore decided that rewards should be given to Harrison (£10,000), Mayer (£3000, posthumously) and others involved in helping to develop the lunar-distance method. Harrison was told that a further reward of £10,000 would be forthcoming if he could demonstrate the replicability of his watch. Although Harrison and his son later accused Maskelyne of bias against the timekeeping method, charges repeated by authors such as Dava Sobel and Rupert Gould, Maskelyne never submitted a method or an idea of his own for consideration by the Board of Longitude. He was to play a significant role in having marine timekeepers, as well as the lunar-distance method, developed, tested and used on board voyages of exploration.

Since the observations that fed into the Nautical Almanac were made at the Royal Observatory, Greenwich, the Greenwich meridian became the reference for measurements of longitude in the Royal Navy, and on British Admiralty charts. It was subsequently chosen for adoption as the international Prime Meridian in 1884.

=== Measurement of latitude ===
Maskelyne took a great interest in various geodetical operations, including the measurement of the length of a degree of latitude in Maryland and Pennsylvania, executed by Mason and Dixon in 1766 – 1768, and later the determination of the relative longitude of Greenwich and Paris. On the French side the work was conducted by Count Cassini, Legendre, and Méchain; on the English side by General Roy. This triangulation was the beginning of the great trigonometrical survey which was subsequently extended all over Britain. His observations appeared in four large folio volumes from 1776 to 1811, some of them being reprinted in Samuel Vince's Elements of Astronomy.

=== Schiehallion experiment ===
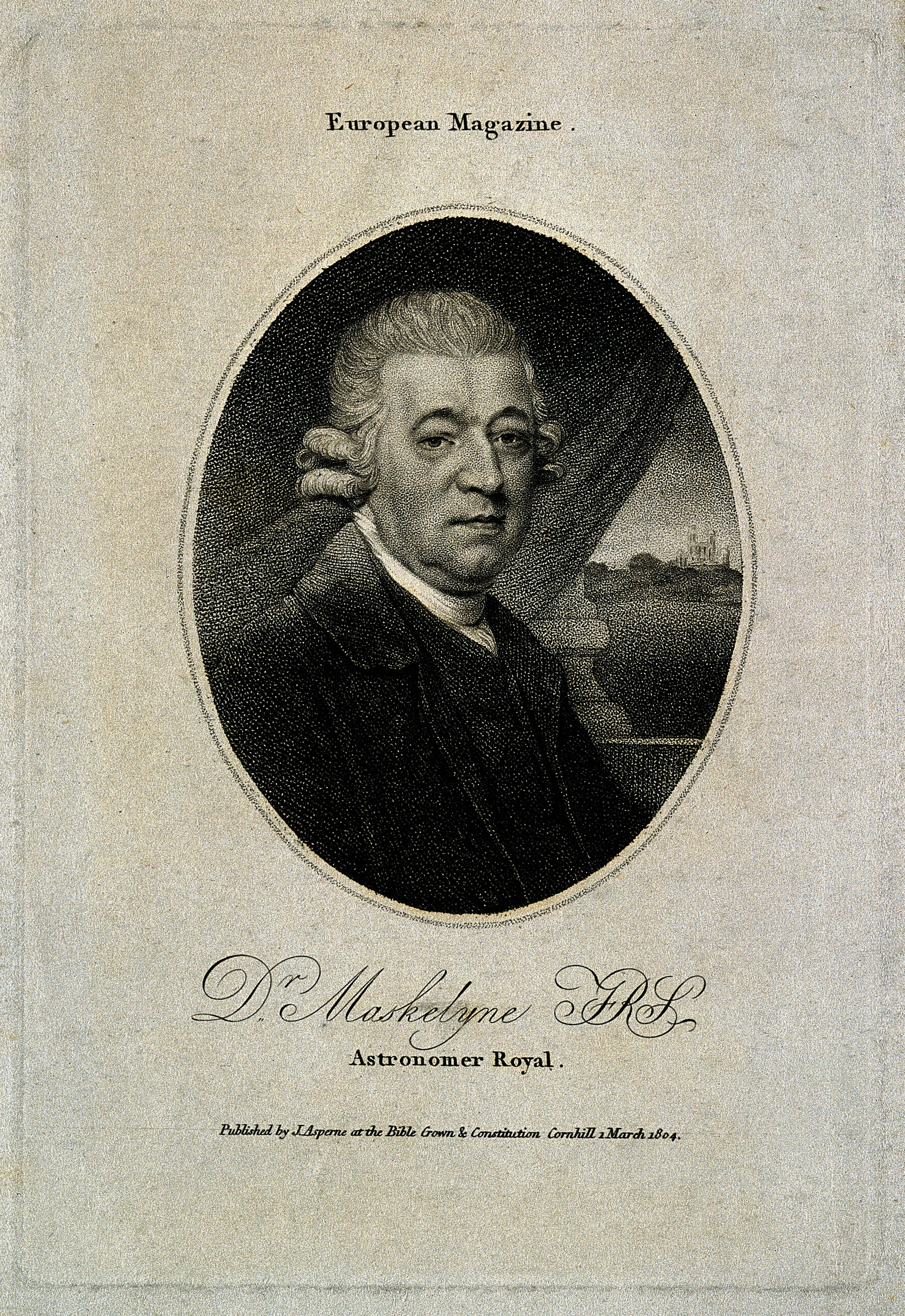
1804 portrait of Maskelyne

In 1772 Maskelyne proposed to the Royal Society what was to become known as the Schiehallion experiment (named after the Scottish mountain on which it was performed), for the determination of the Earth's density using a plumb line. He was not the first to suggest this, Pierre Bouguer and Charles-Marie de la Condamine having attempted the same experiment in 1738 in the Andes.

Maskelyne performed his experiment in 1774 on Schiehallion in Perthshire, Scotland, the mountain being chosen due to its regular conical shape which permitted a reasonably accurate determination of its volume. The apparent difference of latitude between two stations on opposite sides of the mountain were compared with the real difference of latitude obtained by triangulation.

From Maskelyne's observations Charles Hutton deduced a density for the earth 4.5 times that of water (the modern value is 5.515).

== Other work ==
Maskelyne's first contribution to astronomical literature was A Proposal for Discovering the Annual Parallax of Sirius, published in 1760. Subsequent contributions to the Transactions contained his observations of the transits of Venus (1761 and 1769), on the tides at Saint Helena (1762), and on various astronomical phenomena at Saint Helena (1764) and at Barbados (1764).

Maskelyne also introduced several practical improvements, such as the measurement of time to tenths of a second and prevailed upon the government to replace Bird's mural quadrant by a repeating circle 6 feet (1.8 m) in diameter. The new instrument was constructed by Edward Troughton but Maskelyne did not live to see it completed.

== Maskelyne in literature and the arts ==
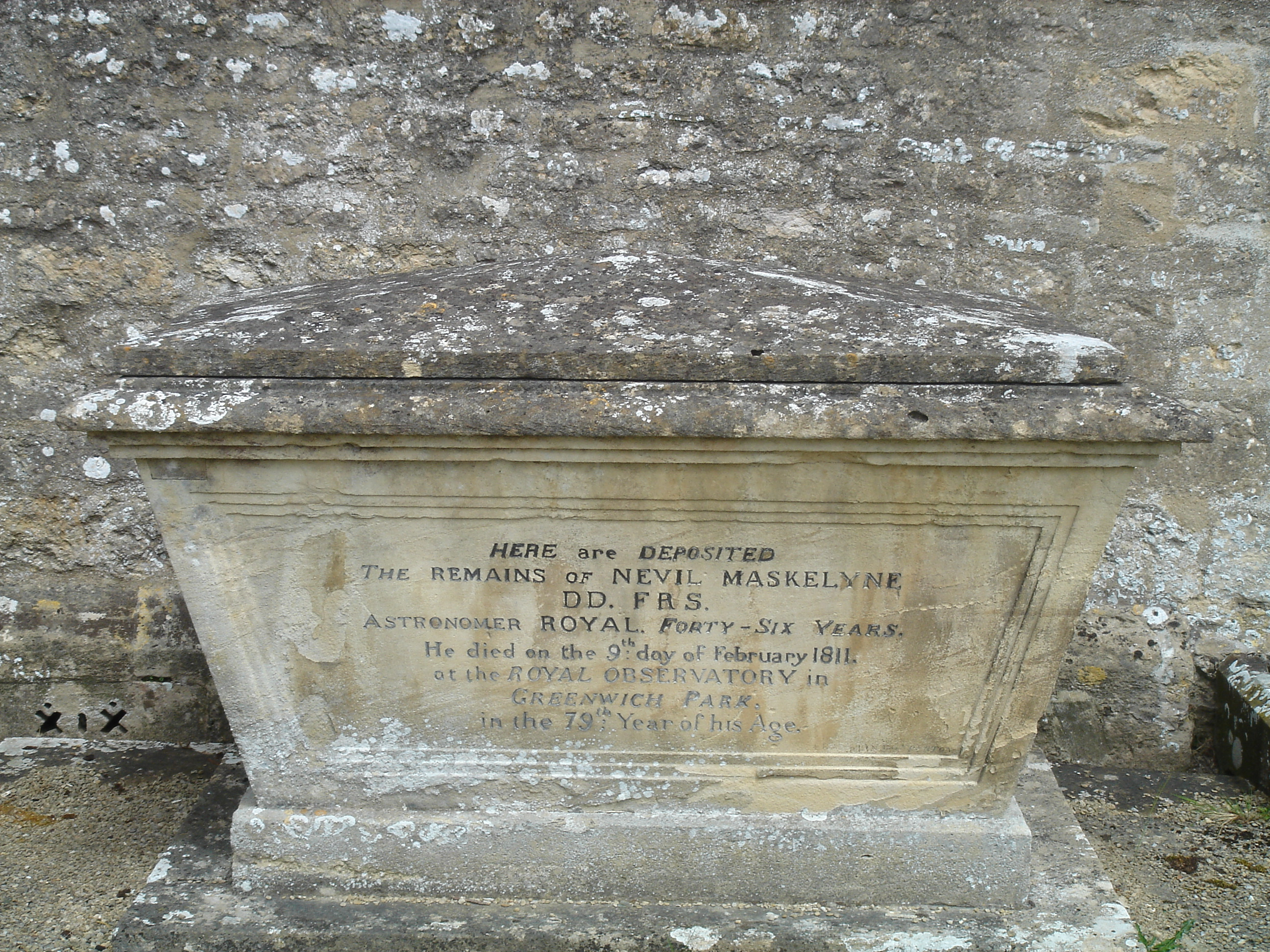
Maskelyne's tomb in Purton, Wiltshire

- Maskelyne features prominently in Dava Sobel's 1995 book, Longitude: The True Story of a Lone Genius Who Solved the Greatest Scientific Problem of His Time, as well as the television serial based on the book, where he is portrayed by Samuel West.
- Maskelyne is a supporting character in the novel Mason & Dixon by Thomas Pynchon. He and Charles Mason (and briefly, Jeremiah Dixon before he returns to Cape Town) meet on Saint Helena - with the characters of the two clashing while they spend time with each other.
- Maskelyne is portrayed as "Dr. Vickery" in Kate Grenville's semi-historical novel The Lieutenant.

== Honours ==
- 1775 – Awarded the Royal Society's Copley Medal
- 1776 – Elected a Member of the Saint Petersburg Academy of Sciences.
- 1778 – Elected a Foreign Honorary Member of the American Academy of Arts and Sciences.
- The lunar crater Maskelyne in the Sea of Tranquility is named after him.
- William Wales named the Maskelyne Islands in southern Malekule, Vanuatu after him while on James Cook's second voyage on HMS Resolution.
- Also during Cook's second voyage, the colony at Botany Bay had a small area next to the newly established observatory named Point Maskelyne.

== Works ==
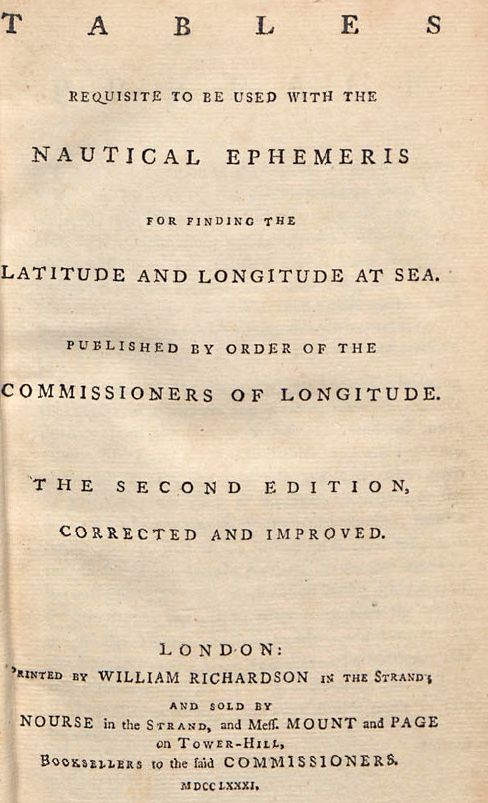
Tables requisite to be used with the astronomical and nautical ephemeris for finding the latitude and longitude at sea, 1781

- Tables requisite to be used with the astronomical and nautical ephemeris for finding the latitude and longitude at sea. London: William Richardson. 1781.
