= James Dinwiddie (astronomer) =

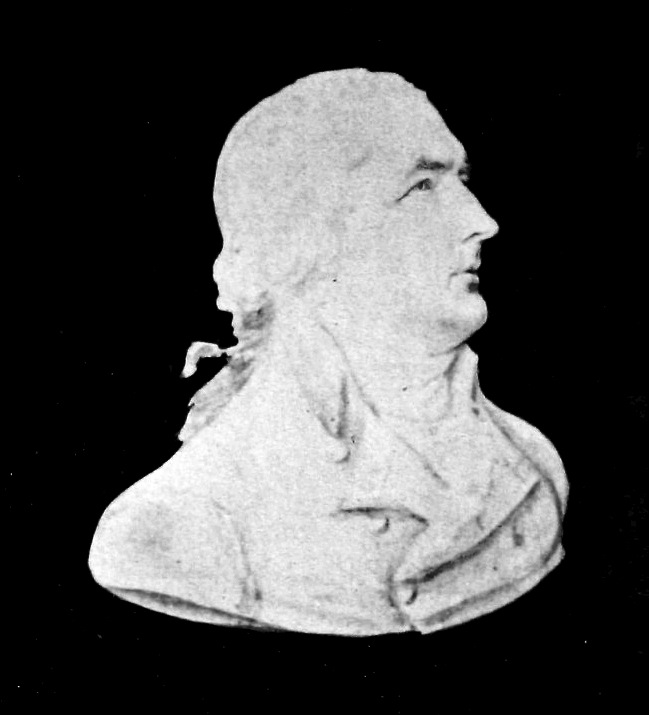
Profile from frontispiece in the biography by his grandson William Jardine Proudfoot

James Dinwiddie (born 8 December 1746 in Dumfries – died 19 March 1815 in Pentonville) was a Scottish physicist, astronomer, inventor and natural philosopher. He was an early example of a science popularizer, giving tours and experimental demonstrations across England and Ireland. He travelled and resided in Calcutta, India and travelled to China along with Lord Macartney as part of the Macartney Embassy to lecture on physics and promote British astronomical techniques.

== Life and work ==
Dinwiddie was born on 8 December 1746 in Tinwald near Dumfries where his parents John Dinwoody and Catharine Riddick were farmers. One of five children, he was born shortly after the death of his father. He worked on the farm and gained an interest in mechanical devices, building a wooden clock even as a young boy. He went to school at Dumfries Academy where he studied mathematics and languages and continued his studies at the University of Edinburgh. The family hoped he would join the church but he took an interest in science. After his studies he spent some time as a teacher of mathematics and natural philosophy (physics mostly). Around this period he took a special interest in surveying and navigation. In February 1778 he received a Master of Arts from the University of Edinburgh and he was invited to teach at Ayr by Professor Dugald Stewart. In his lectures he demonstrated experiments, instruments and emphasised the use of mathematical principles involved in physical laws and gave examples to support his view:

...When Dr. Black pointed out a variety of double exchanges, and arranged them in a convenient order, he was only a natural historian; but when he came to investigate the immediate cause, and assert the nature of the power which produces the double exchange, he was obliged to employ the property of number and figure. In short, gentlemen, without a moderate share of mathematical knowledge, you can expect only a schoolboy's acquaintance with natural philosophy, resembling those religionists who take up their authority on the opinion of their priests, and neither can give a reason for what they think they believe, nor apply it to any good purpose in life...

Dinwiddie, however, earned little. For some time he taught geography. When Charles Spalding, the inventor of a diving bell and fellow experimenter, was killed in 1783 in an underwater operation, Dinwiddie attempted to examine the cause of the accident. When Jean-Pierre Blanchard and others began to make ballooning popular in Europe, Dinwiddie also attempted to make one. He used a technique to make silk airtight and ballooned from Bristol to Waterford while forgetting to pay his rent back in Dublin and nearly losing all his equipment which were to be sold off by the owner.

He received an honorary Doctor of Law degree in 1792 from the University of Edinburgh and he was invited to join the embassy of Lord Macartney to China in 1792-93 where he was to demonstrate science and especially astronomy, a diving bell and a balloon for the Chinese emperor. He was initially designated as "Machinist to the Embassy" and later as "Astronomer". The astronomical instruments failed to impress the Chinese, unlike a German-made planetarium device known as the Weltmaschine designed by Philipp Matthäus Hahn.

Returning from China, Dinwiddie met Sir John Shore, Governor-General of Bengal, stayed on in Calcutta and continued his researches. In 1795 he gathered subscriptions to lecture to nearly 180 ladies and gentlemen in Calcutta and raised rupees 100 for it. Some of the surveying instruments carried by Dinwiddie to China such as the chain were then sold in Calcutta and used by William Lambton in his initial surveys in southern India.

In August 1795 Dinwiddie was appointed to assist the Board of Trade on matters of science for a salary of 500 rupees a month for a year; but this was not extended. He also constructed a voltaic pile with which he claimed to have "treated" patients with palsy and rheumatism with electric shocks.

Meanwhile, Dinwiddie was appointed as professor of natural philosophy at the Fort William College in 1801. He also conducted public as well as private lectures and demonstrations for Europeans and some of the Indian elite. He trained the Indian students Hurry Mohun Thakoor and Gopee Mohun Deb in astronomy in 1795. His students included the surveyor James Rennell. Dinwiddie advised the East India Company, prepared the chemists kit carried by Francis Buchanan for his survey of Mysore and manufactured nitrous acid for use in the hospital at Calcutta. Dinwiddie was also in correspondence with Joseph Hume who was his agent and supplier of chemicals in London. In 1796 he visited Madras where he met the Governor, Lord Hobart. He was elected to the Asiatic Society of Bengal.

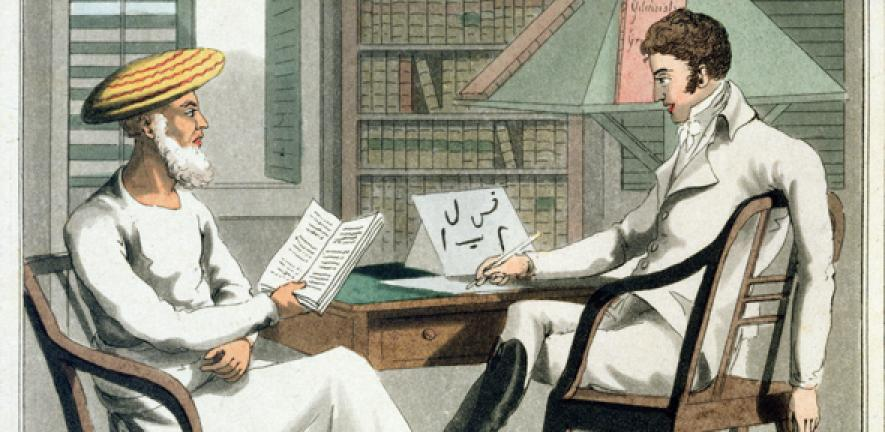
James Dinwiddie and Allama Tafazzul Husain Kashmiri.

He believed that without mathematical reasoning one could not dig deeper in science. He said:

"Only in those parts of the science which have been mathematically considered, that natural philosophy can boast of having carried on her investigations with certainty, success and utility."

He believed that without mathematically described knowledge, one could not go beyond a schoolboy's understanding of science. Allama Tafazzul Husain Kashmiri had already translated Newton's "Principia" into Arabic in 1789. After Dinwiddie started teaching in Calcutta, in October 24, 1794, the old Allama enrolled himself as a student. Dinwiddie first taught him Optics and then modern geometry. To his surprise, Tafazzul was struggling with mathematics. He rermarked:

"It is somewhat irregular that a man who reads so much theory should be so totally ignorant of practical mathematics".

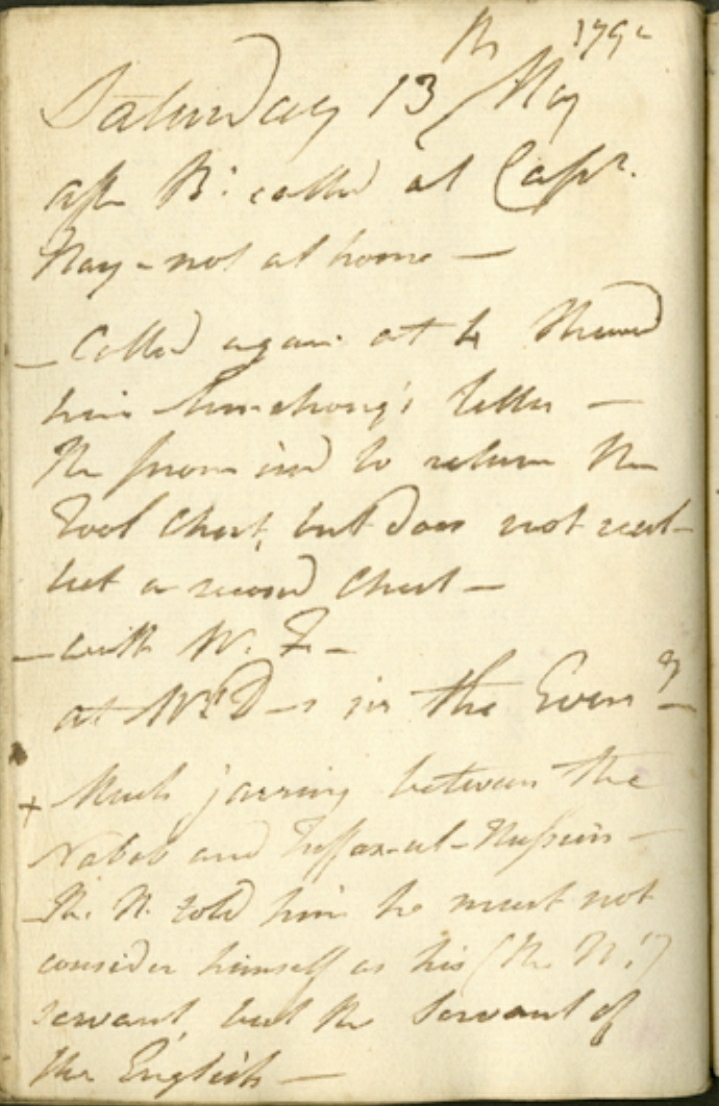
James Dinwiddie notes in his diary: "Much jarring between the Nabob and Tafazzul Husain - the N told him he must not consider himself as his (the N's) servant but the servant of the English." Dinwiddie Journal B 39–13 May 1797.

Allama was also burdened with the job of ambassador of Awadh, and he had to discontinue the tuitions. Back in Lucknow, the nawab was unhappy and called him 'servant of the English', for becoming too occupied with learning and translation of modern scientific knowledge. In November 1795, he resumed and this time Dinwiddie taught him experimental astronomy.

Dinwiddie left India in September 1806 and returned to England. He settled in London where he put together a collection of curiosities from India, China and Java. His hearing and health declined but he continued to pursue his researches, attending the lectures of others. In July 1810 he was elected to the Royal Institution and was made a member of the Committee of Mathematics, Mechanics, and Mechanical inventions.

Dinwiddie was never married but he acknowledged a daughter Ann, named after her mother Ann Muir.

== See also ==
- Tafazzul Husain Kashmiri
- Reuben Burrow
