= Chronometer watch =

High-precision time piece

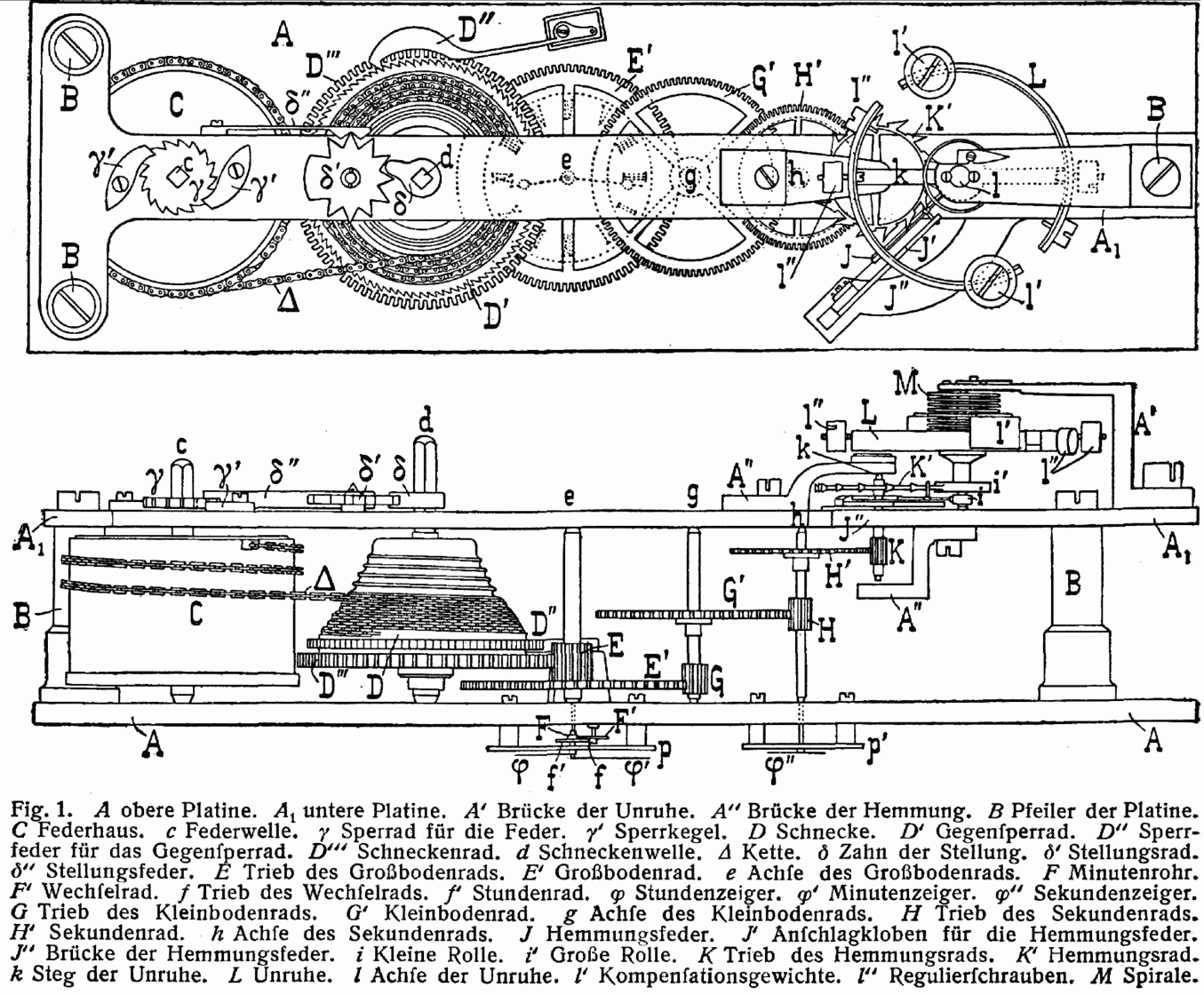
Inside a chronometer mechanism (c. 1904)

A chronometer (Ancient Greek: χρονόμετρον, khronómetron, "time measurer") is a highly accurate mechanical timepiece, with an original focus on the needs of maritime navigation. In Switzerland, timepieces certified by the Contrôle Officiel Suisse des Chronomètres (COSC) may be marked as Certified Chronometer or Officially Certified Chronometer. Outside Switzerland, equivalent bodies, such as the Japan Chronometer Inspection Institute, have in the past certified timepieces to similar standards, although use of the term has not always been strictly controlled.

== History ==
The term chronometer was coined by Jeremy Thacker of Beverley, England in 1714, referring to his invention of a clock ensconced in a vacuum chamber. The term chronometer is also used to describe a marine chronometer used for celestial navigation and determination of longitude. The marine chronometer was invented by John Harrison in 1730. This was the first of a series of chronometers that enabled accurate marine navigation. From then on, an accurate chronometer was essential to open-ocean marine or air navigation out of sight of land. Early in the 20th century the advent of radiotelegraphy time signals supplemented the onboard marine chronometer for marine and air navigation, and various radio navigation systems were invented, developed, and implemented during and following the Second World War (e.g., Gee, Sonne (a.k.a. Consol), LORAN(-A and -C), Decca Navigator System and Omega Navigation System) that significantly reduced the need for positioning using an onboard marine chronometer. These culminated in the development and implementation of global satellite navigation systems (GSN-GPS) in the last quarter of the 20th century. The marine chronometer is no longer used as the primary means for navigation at sea, although it is still required as a backup, since radio systems and their associated electronics can fail for a variety of reasons.

Once mechanical timepiece movements developed sufficient precision to allow for accurate marine navigation, there eventually developed what became known as "chronometer competitions" at astronomical observatories located in Europe. The Neuchâtel Observatory, Geneva Observatory, Besançon Observatory, and Kew Observatory are prominent examples of observatories that certified the accuracy of mechanical timepieces. The observatory testing regime typically lasted for 30 to 50 days and contained accuracy standards that were far more stringent and difficult than modern standards such as those set by COSC. When a movement passed the observatory, it became certified as an observatory chronometer and received a Bulletin de Marche from the Observatory, stipulating the performance of the movement. Because only very few movements were ever given the attention and manufacturing level necessary to pass the Observatory standards, there are very few observatory chronometers in existence.

Most observatory chronometers had movements so specialized to accuracy that they could never withstand being used as wristwatches in normal usage. They were useful only for accuracy competitions, and so never were sold to the public for usage. However, in 1966 and 1967, Girard Perregaux manufactured approximately 670 wristwatches with the Calibre 32A movement, which became Observatory Chronometers certified by the Neuchatel Observatory, while in 1968, 1969 and 1970 Seiko had 226 wristwatches with its 4520 and 4580 Calibres certified. These observatory chronometers were then sold to the public for normal usage as wristwatches, and some examples may still be found today.

The observatory competitions ended with the advent of the quartz watch movement, in the late 1960s and early 1970s, which generally has superior accuracy at far lesser costs. In 2009, the Watch Museum of Le Locle renewed the tradition and launched a new chronometry contest based on ISO 3159 certification. In 2017, the Observatory Chronometer Database (OCD) went online, which contains all mechanical timepieces ("chronometres-mecaniques") certified as observatory chronometers by the observatory in Neuchatel from 1945 to 1967, due to a successful participation in the competition which resulted in the issuance of a Bulletin de Marche. All database entries are submissions to the wristwatch category ("chronometres-bracelet") at the observatory competition.

The term chronometer is often wrongly used by the general public to refer to timekeeping instruments fitted with an additional mechanism that may be set in motion by pushbuttons to enable measurement of the duration of an event. Such an instrument, typically called a stopwatch, is in fact a chronograph or chronoscope. It may be chronometer certified, provided it meets the criteria set for the standard.

== Mechanical chronometers ==
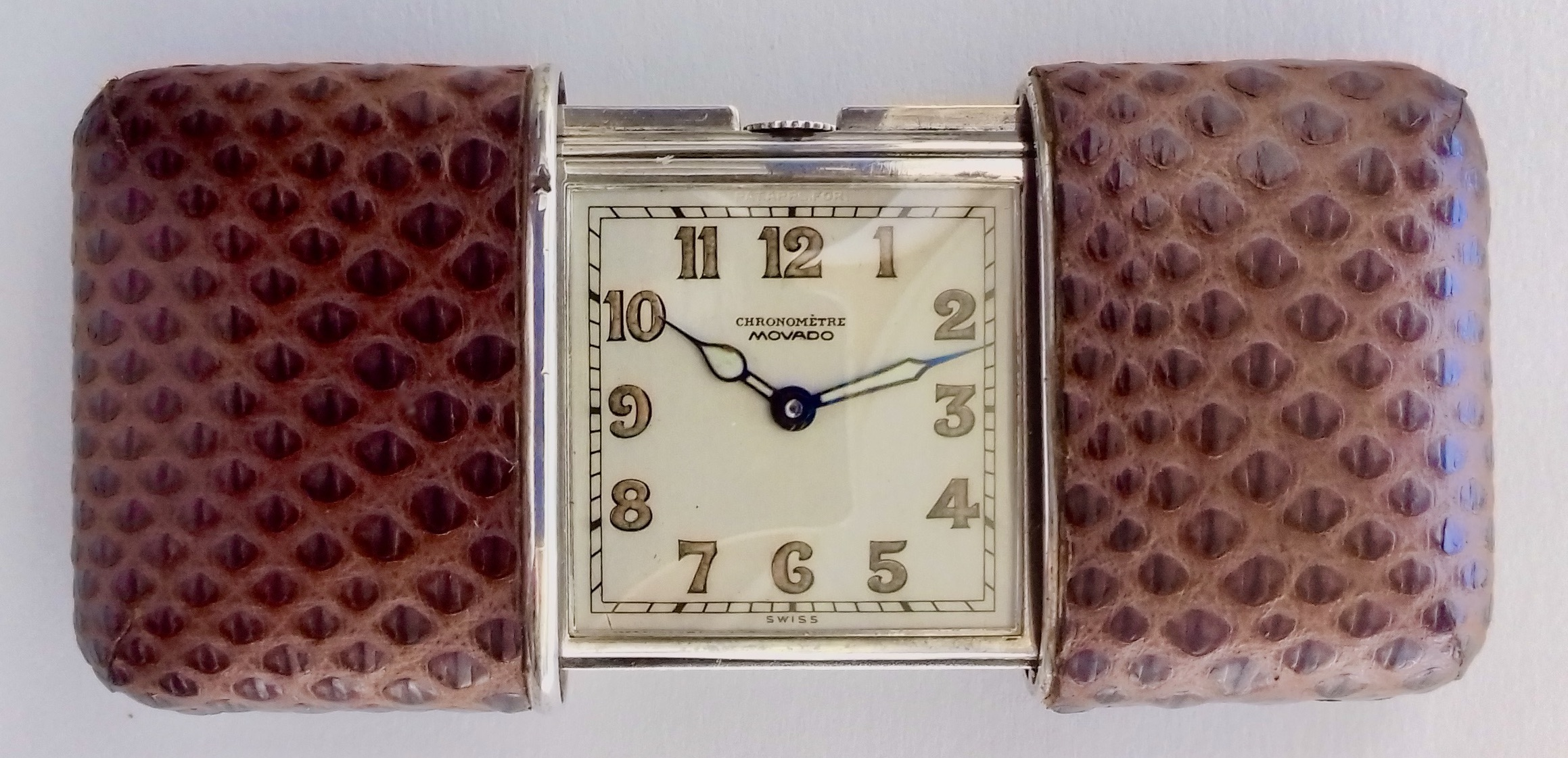
A 1928 Movado Ermeto mechanical chronometer.

A mechanical chronometer is a spring-driven escapement timekeeper, like a watch, but its parts are more massively built. Changes in the elasticity of the balance spring caused by variations in temperature are compensated for by devices built into it.

Chronometers often included other innovations to increase their efficiency and precision. Hard stones such as diamond, ruby, and sapphire were often used as jewel bearings to decrease friction and wear of the pivots and escapement. Chronometer makers also took advantage of the physical properties of rare metals such as gold, platinum, and palladium.

=== Complications ===
In horological terms, a complication in a mechanical watch is a special feature that causes the design of the watch movement to become more complicated. Examples of complications include:

- Tourbillon
- Perpetual calendar
- Minute repeater
- Equation of time
- Power reserve indicator
- Moon phases
- Chronograph
- Rattrapante
- Grande sonnerie

== More recent times ==
Quartz and atomic timepieces have made mechanical chronometers obsolete for time standards used scientifically and/or industrially. Most watchmakers do still produce them. However, they are mostly considered status symbols promoted by luxury watchmakers as a symbol of fine craftmanship and aesthetics.

== Certified chronometers ==
More than 1.8 million officially-certified chronometer certificates, mostly for mechanical wristwatch chronometers (wristwatches) with sprung balance oscillators, are being delivered each year, after passing the COSC's most extreme tests and being singly identified by an officially-recorded individual serial number. According to COSC, an officially-certified chronometer is a high-precision watch capable of displaying the seconds and housing a movement that has been tested over several days, in different positions, and at different temperatures, by an official, neutral body (COSC). Each movement is individually tested for several consecutive days, in five positions and at three temperatures. Any watch with denominations "certified chronometer" or "officially-certified chronometer" contains a certified movement and matches the criteria in ISO 3159 Timekeeping instruments—wristwatch chronometers with spring balance oscillator.

== See also ==
- Horology
- Chronograph
- COSC
- Marine chronometer
- Railroad chronometer
- Tachymeter
- Clock
- Mechanical watch
- Jewel bearing
- Navigation
- Observatory chronometer
- The Nautical Almanac
- American Practical Navigator
- Webb C. Ball
- Watchmaker
