= The Geneva School of Watchmaking =

Geneva School of Watchmaking
- École d'horlogerie de Genève
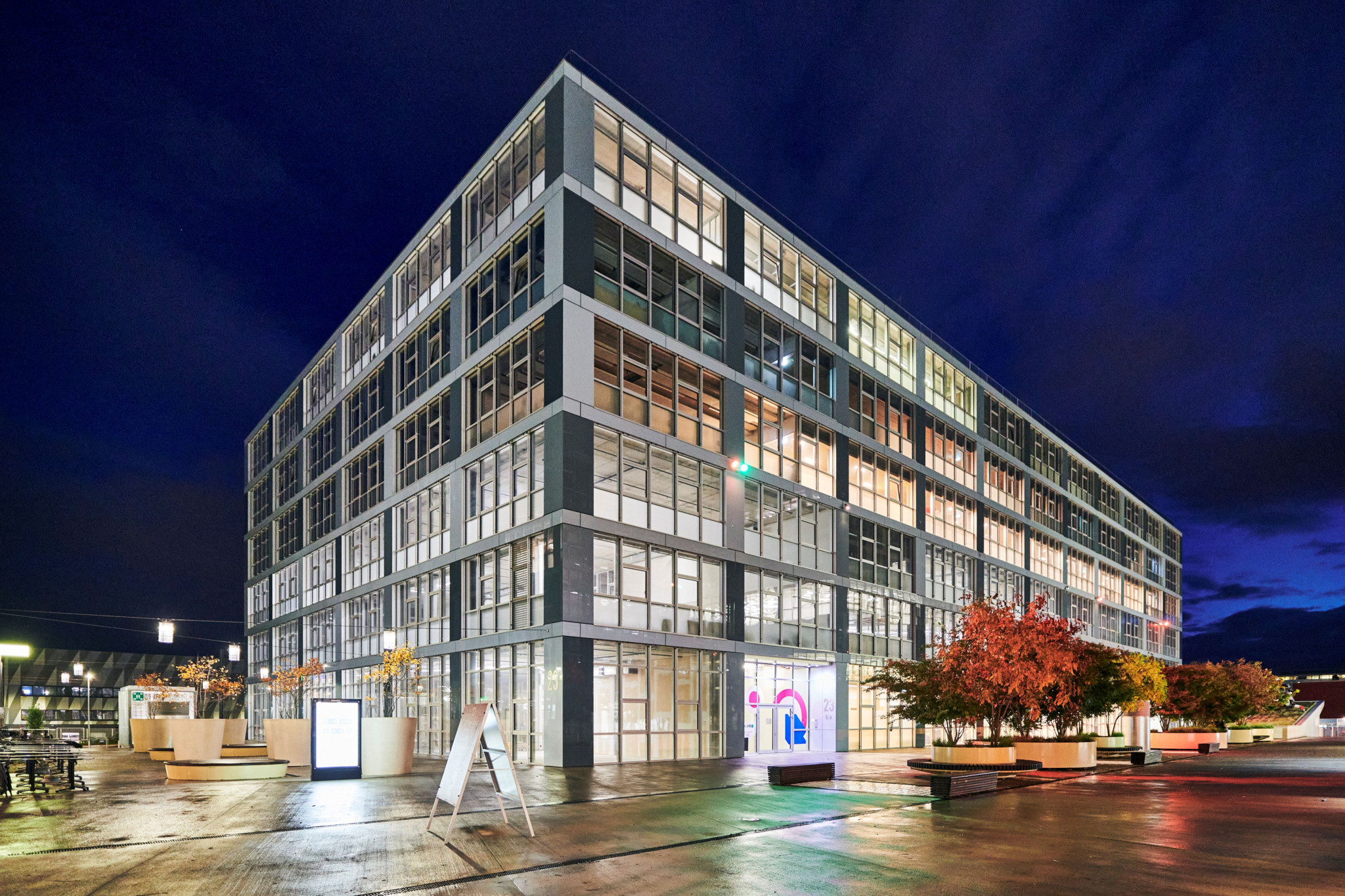
- New campus at Espace Tourbillon, Plan-les-Ouates (2023)

Location
- Switzerland
- Coordinates: 46.16629°N 6.103214°E

Information
- Type: Vocational school
- Established: October 13, 1824
- Enrollment: 300
- Campus: Plan-les-Ouates (Espace Tourbillon)
- Campus size: 8,500 square metres (91,000 sq ft)
- Campus type: Urban
- Affiliation: Centre de formation professionnelle technique (CFPT)
- Website: edu.ge.ch/site/cfpt-horlogerie/

The Geneva School of Watchmaking (École d'horlogerie de Genève,) is a vocational school in Geneva, Switzerland, dedicated to instruction in horology and micromechanics. Established on 13 October 1824 by the Société des Arts de Genève, the institution stands as Switzerland's oldest watchmaking school. Operating under the Geneva Department of Public Instruction (DIP), the school forms part of the Centre de formation professionnelle technique (CFPT).

Throughout its history, the institution has shaped the inspection criteria for the Geneva Seal (Poinçon de Genève) and cultivated successive generations of watchmakers who advanced Geneva's preeminence in haute horlogerie. Coinciding with bicentennial celebrations in 2023, the school transferred to purpose-built premises at the Espace Tourbillon complex in Plan-les-Ouates, situating itself amid Geneva's watchmaking cluster alongside manufacturers including Rolex, Patek Philippe, Vacheron Constantin, and Piaget.

== History ==
=== Early endeavours in horological education (1771-1823) ===
The earliest documented proposal for formal horological instruction in Geneva appeared in 1771, when the Registres des Conseils recorded a motion to appoint "one or two Master Watchmakers" charged with teaching horological principles. This initiative remained dormant in the archives.

Founded in 1776 by watchmaker Louis Faizan and physicist Horace Bénédict de Saussure, the Société des Arts de Genève (Society of Arts) progressively engaged with industrial education throughout the late 18th century. Watchmaker M. Cresp advanced a proposal in 1786 for a factory producing watch blanks (ébauches en ouvrages bruts) that would simultaneously train apprentices in constructing unfinished movements, wheel trains for repeaters, and complications. Although initially declined, a commission in 1787 endorsed the establishment of a fabrique de cadratures (complications manufactory).

By May 1788, a workshop dedicated to complications training commenced operations with six apprentices under watchmakers Godemar and Pouzait. Pouzait, who subsequently invented an anchor escapement in 1796, earned distinction for his mastery of complicated watches, particularly those featuring independent dead seconds. Subscription funding sustained the workshop, with contributions from artisans and patrons amounting to 384 louis d'or.

Successive periods of political upheaval interrupted these educational ventures. Stability alone permitted sustained study, whereas civil unrest and revolutionary turmoil consistently derailed progress. Permanent horological schools would not materialise until 1823, when circumstances finally aligned.

=== Establishment of the École de Blanc (1824) ===
On 13 October 1824, the Société des Arts de Genève, acting through its industrial class (Classe d'Industrie), formally inaugurated the Geneva School of Watchmaking. Initial instruction centred on an "École de Blanc," a programme devoted to producing the blanc (rough watch movement) that constitutes the foundation of watchmaking.

The school first occupied premises at Place Longemalle in central Geneva, on the site now hosting the Hôtel Touring-Balance. Operations also extended briefly to a former grain granary on Rue de Rive.

This establishment addressed a pressing concern: young Genevans aspiring to master blanc production had previously been compelled to seek apprenticeships in distant locales, whether the surrounding countryside, the Ain department of France, Savoy, or the Vallée de Joux. Such dispersal deprived them of concurrent instruction available within Geneva. At a committee meeting on 12 September 1823, M. Darier cadet highlighted this predicament, urging the Society to sponsor a blantier (blanc-maker) to practise within the city. Following deliberation, M. Roman presented a comprehensive report on 26 September 1823 advocating the school's creation.

The École de Blanc instituted a structured curriculum encompassing the fundamental elements of movement construction: plate fabrication, bridge production, wheel train assembly, and basic mechanism manufacturing. Pupils typically devoted 2½ to 3 years to mastering these techniques prior to advancing toward specialised instruction.

=== Expansion through the École de Finissage (1824-1843) ===
Shortly following the École de Blanc's establishment, the Société des Arts identified a need for instruction in finissage (finishing), the exacting discipline of completing and refining watch movements to commercial standards. An École de Finissage emerged, where students acquired proficiency in working compensated balances and crafting ruby lever components for escapements. This programme spanned approximately 3 years, rendering a complete apprenticeship through both schools roughly 6 years in duration.

Relocation in 1827 to the Maison Oltramare on the Île (an island in the Rhône) facilitated curricular expansion incorporating dedicated finishing instruction. This reflected recognition that Geneva's competitive distinction resided in superior aesthetic execution of movements, anticipating the Poinçon de Genève standards.

Statistical analysis in 1836 documented career outcomes for 23 students who completed their full apprenticeship:

Graduate career outcomes (1836)
Profession	Graduates
Repasseurs (adjusters/finishers)	11 (including 2 abroad)
Planteurs d'échappements (escapement assemblers)	9
Faiseurs d'échappements (escapement makers)	2
Jewel piercer	1
Total	23

School graduates received immediate recognition as skilled workers upon completion, whereas those apprenticed elsewhere frequently required an additional 6–12 months as réassujettis (re-apprentices) under new masters.

Specialised classes were progressively introduced during this period:

Specialised classes (1824-1843)
Discipline	Scope
Cadratures (complications mechanisms)	Calendar mechanisms, repeaters, and associated complications
Échappements (escapements)	Cylinder escapements initially; lever escapements subsequently
Repassage (adjusting and finishing)	Final refinement of completed movements

Distinguished masters during this formative period included Jean Odet directing the École de Blanc, Victor Terroux serving as assistant master, Ch.-L. Schemidtmeyer overseeing complications instruction, and various specialists addressing escapements and finishing.

=== Municipal stewardship (1843-1933) ===
The municipality of Geneva assumed administrative responsibility for the school in 1843, supplanting the Société des Arts and inaugurating an era of formal governmental oversight. Enhanced financial stability accompanied this transition, enabling expansion of both facilities and programmes.

Purpose-built premises on Rue Necker received the school in 1878, with spaces specifically configured to accommodate workshops and classrooms. This location served as the centre of Genevan horological education for nearly seven decades.

Female students gained admission in 1894, though initial provisions afforded them partial rather than comprehensive professional certification.

=== The Grenier à blé period (1859-1899) ===
For four decades, the school inhabited the Grenier à blé (Grain Warehouse), alternatively designated the Grenier de Rive, situated at the base of Rue Verdaine. Access from Rue du Vieux-Collège proceeded via an expansive, well-lit staircase of molasse stone featuring a central shaft originally employed for hoisting grain sacks by pulley. Enterprising students reputedly utilised this apparatus to circumvent stair descent, notwithstanding prohibition.

Enrollment growth necessitated construction of additional workshops above the original spaces. The venerable gables of the Grenier à blé acquired a crown of windows, eventually supporting up to three stories of workshops along the western elevation.

Annual prize distributions and exhibitions became established traditions during this era. Commencing in 1854, ceremonies convened in the concert hall (salle de concert); from 1855, venues shifted to a room at the Musée Rath, subsequently to the hall of the École Industrielle. These July or August gatherings featured performances by the Conservatory orchestra.

The school garnered recognition at prominent exhibitions, securing a silver medal at the 1857 Swiss Industry Exhibition in Bern and a bronze medal at the 1860 Universal Exhibition in Besançon.

=== Crisis and reform (1855-1868) ===
A severe institutional crisis afflicted the school during the late 1850s and early 1860s. Following brief prosperity during the "Fabrique" period (1854-1855), a European industrial downturn precipitated sharp enrollment decline:

Enrollment decline (1855-1865)
Year	Students
1855	100
1859	60
1862	42
1865	16

Such contraction necessitated M. Terroux's dismissal after 20 years as a master of the École de Blanc, along with closure of the girls' school.

A commission of experts convened by the Municipal Council diagnosed multiple deficiencies: theoretical and practical lacunae within the curriculum; insufficient engagement with watch industry developments; excessively theoretical workshop training (repassage) that obliged graduates to pursue supplementary practical apprenticeships prior to gainful employment.

Remedial measures encompassed tuition reduction to 5 francs monthly, provision of complimentary tools, establishment of a practical workshop class, and accommodation permitting weaker students to specialise rather than completing the comprehensive curriculum. A reconstituted directorial commission received mandate in 1866 to implement these reforms.

=== Integration into the École des Arts et Métiers (1933) ===
Integration in 1933 brought the school within the École des Arts et Métiers (Arts and Crafts School), predecessor to the contemporary Centre de Formation Professionnelle Technique de Genève (CFPT). This consolidation afforded access to broader institutional resources whilst preserving the specialised horological focus.

=== Twentieth-century relocations ===
Successive relocations marked the school's twentieth-century development:

Campus relocations (20th century)
Year	Location	Context
1946	Rue de la Prairie	Post-war capacity expansion
1968	Route du Pont-Butin, Petit-Lancy	Shared premises with electricity and automotive programmes within the CFPT network; separation occurred in 1987 with modernisation completed 1992-1993

The Petit-Lancy campus accommodated the school for over half a century. Within the CFPT network, shared facilities with electronics and automotive programmes fostered an environment treating watchmaking as a rigorous technical discipline.

=== Bicentennial and Espace Tourbillon (2023-2024) ===
Relocation to the "Espace Tourbillon" campus in Plan-les-Ouates occurred in late 2023, coinciding with the bicentennial commemoration. This strategic positioning, within a district colloquially termed "Plan-les-Watches," situates the institution amid Geneva's watchmaking concentration alongside Rolex, Vacheron Constantin, and Piaget.

Official inauguration transpired on 23 November 2023. Physical embedding within the watchmaking cluster effectively eliminated geographic barriers between training and employment.

Bicentennial preparations commenced in 2021 with comprehensive archival classification. Culminating this heritage preservation initiative, historian Gérard Duc authored a richly illustrated volume exceeding 200 pages: Garantir la tradition, porter l'innovation: Les 200 premières années de l'École d'horlogerie de Genève (Guaranteeing tradition, driving innovation: The first 200 years of the Geneva School of Watchmaking).

Comprehensive campus chronology
Period	Location	Strategic context
1824-1827	Place Longemalle	Foundation; formal pedagogy for blancs production established
1827-1839	En l'Ile (Maison Oltramare)	Finissage instruction introduced
1859-1899	Grenier à blé (Rue Verdaine)	Principal campus during 19th-century expansion
1878-1946	Rue Necker	Purpose-built premises; adaptation to mechanisation
1946-1968	Rue de la Prairie	Post-war expansion for wristwatch production
1968-2023	Petit-Lancy (Pont-Butin)	CFPT integration; federal apprenticeship standardisation
2023–present	Plan-les-Ouates (Espace Tourbillon)	Immersion within luxury watchmaking hub; Industry 4.0 readiness

== Education and programmes ==
=== Admissions ===
Admission remains competitive, reflecting the diploma's prestige. Candidates must present completed compulsory schooling (Cycle d'Orientation) with demonstrated proficiency in mathematics and physics.

Entrance examination components
Assessment	Scope
Theoretical examination	Logic, mathematics, French proficiency
Practical examination	Patience, precision, capacity to execute complex micro-mechanical instructions

Standard entry age is 15, with 25 typically constituting the upper threshold for initial vocational training.

=== Apprenticeship programmes ===
Full-time vocational training programmes lead to the Swiss Federal Certificate of Vocational Education and Training (CFC, Certificat fédéral de capacité), conforming to ordinances issued by the State Secretariat for Education, Research and Innovation (SEFRI):

CFC programmes
Programme	French designation	Duration	Emphasis
Watchmaking (Rhabillage track)	Horloger/Horlogère	4 years	Service, repair, and restoration of complex timepieces; training of the "Horloger Complet"
Watchmaking (Production track)	Horloger de production	3 years	Industrial assembly and quality assurance for contemporary manufactories
Watch finishing	Termineur en habillage horloger	3 years	External components: case, dial, and bracelet finishing encompassing polishing, satin-finishing, and lapidary techniques
Micromechanics	Micromécanicien/Micromécanicienne	4 years	Precision component manufacturing

Annual enrollment approximates 300 full-time students. The watchmaking programme admits 12 new students yearly, whilst production watchmakers (3-year course) distribute across three cohorts of 12. Following two years of foundational training, 12 students may proceed toward the comprehensive watchmaker's CFC over a total of four years.

Supplementary provision includes two-year full-time ES (École Supérieure) microtechnology technician programmes and inter-company courses for quality control specialists throughout French-speaking Switzerland. Combined enrollment comprises 180 full-time and 120 dual-track students.

=== Curricular structure ===
The four-year Horloger CFC curriculum follows a defined progression:

Horloger CFC curriculum
Years	Emphasis	Core competencies
1-2 (Tronc Commun)	Micromechanics foundation	Tool fabrication (screwdrivers, gravers), filing, turning, pivotage (balance staff pivot turning), fundamental assembly
3-4 (Specialisation)	Rhabillage (Restoration)	Fault diagnosis, obsolete component fabrication, hairspring manipulation (réglage), Phillips terminal curve formation, complications (chronographs, calendars, striking mechanisms)

Graduation mandates fabrication of a Montre École (school watch), requiring students to finish, assemble, and regulate a movement to institutional standards. Bicentennial commemorations featured special projects entitled "Tradition" and "Identité et Design," encouraging reinterpretation of classical aesthetics.

=== Pedagogical approach ===
Instructional methodology emphasises inter-professional collaboration. Micromechanics students serve future watchmakers as "internal clients," manufacturing authentic components under realistic production constraints. Micromechanics apprentices produce all components for micrometers assembled by first-year watchmaking students, alongside elements for the Montres École constructed by graduating watchmakers.

First-year micromechanics apprentices fabricate their own tools whilst working brass, steel, and nickel silver by hand. Second-year instruction continues hand manipulation of various metals under progressively exacting precision requirements. Terminal years concentrate upon manufacturing techniques and numerically-controlled machine programming.

Classes accommodating up to 24 students are structured to facilitate peer learning across grade levels, with glazed classroom walls enabling observation and exchange.

=== Adult education and specialisations ===
The Convention Patronale de l'Industrie Horlogère (CPIH) administers a modular system enabling adults to attain AFP or CFC equivalency through evening or weekend courses delivered by Ifage (Foundation for Adult Education) or the CFH (Centre de Formation en Horlogerie).

Available specialised certifications encompass surface finishing (polishing), enamelling, and quality assurance.

=== Public engagement ===
Apprentices present their disciplines and engage with the public throughout their studies. The school organises workshops alongside prominent events including the Grand Prix d'Horlogerie de Genève, Geneva Watch Days, Autour du Temps, and European Artistic Crafts Days.

== Facilities ==
=== Current campus (2023-present) ===
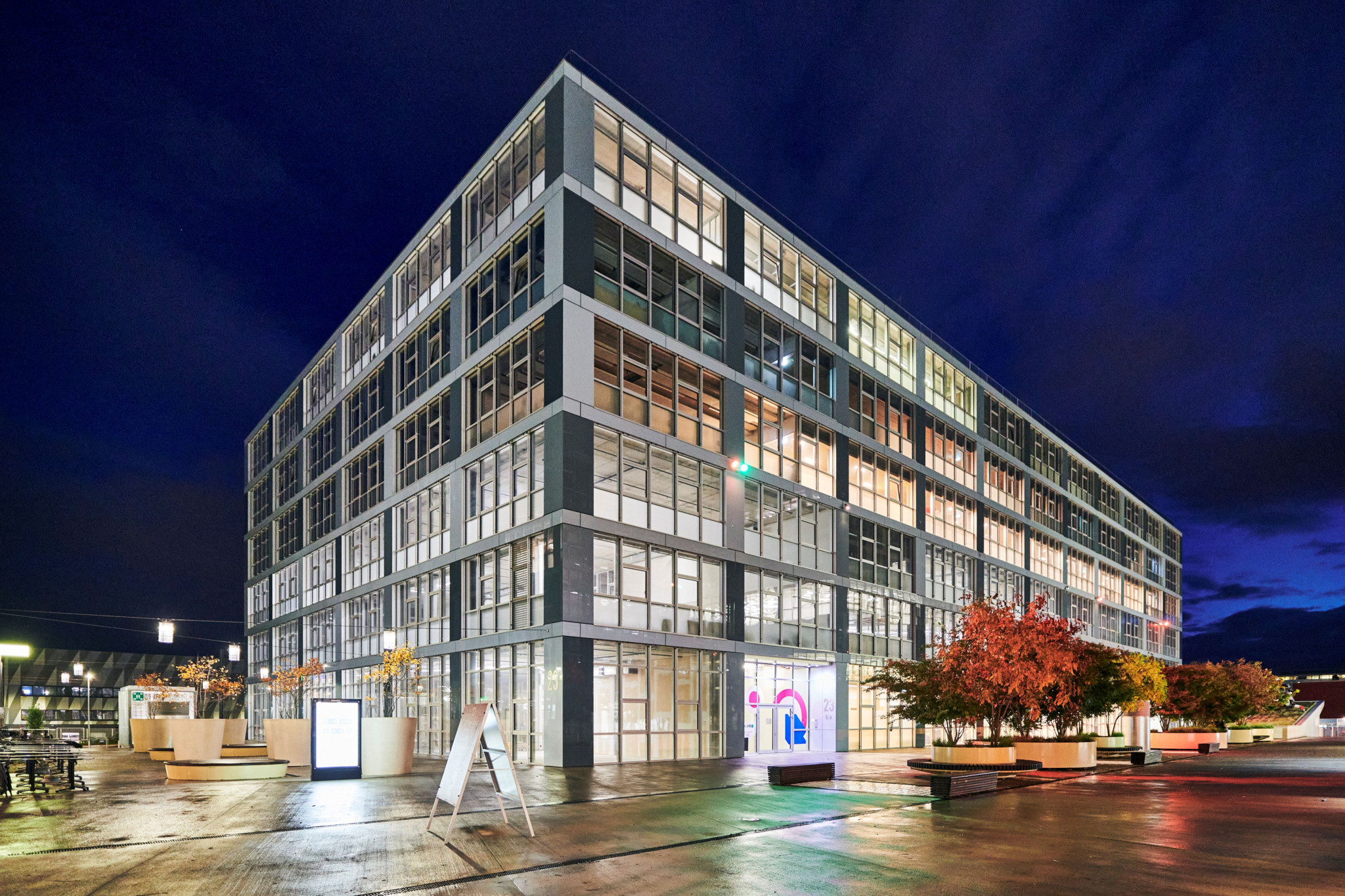
The new campus at Espace Tourbillon, inaugurated in 2023

The school occupies 8,500 square metres (91,000 sq ft) distributed across three floors of a wood-clad concrete building within the Espace Tourbillon business park, designed by Brodbeck Roulet architectes associés in collaboration with the State of Geneva and the ForPro Foundation.

==== Architectural design ====
Internal configuration prioritises transparency and vertical integration, reflecting the hierarchical yet interconnected character of watch production.

A spiral staircase linking the third and fourth floors constitutes a central architectural element, embodying institutional identity whilst fostering physical connection between year groups and encouraging peer learning.

Ateliers are conceived as open, modular spaces capable of adapting to evolving class dimensions or technological requirements. Diverging from traditional classroom configurations, these spaces replicate professional workshops featuring ergonomic benches and localised illumination.

Rigorous separation of "clean" and "dirty" zones represents a critical design consideration. Micromechanics workshops (turning, milling, drilling) maintain physical isolation from watchmaking ateliers (assembly, escapement adjustment) to preclude contamination of delicate movements by metallic particulates and lubricant residue.

Building specifications
Element	Description
Ground floor	Machinery and workshops for micromechanics and quality control apprentices
Third and fourth floors	Classrooms, watchmaking workshops, and laboratories
Construction	Wood-clad concrete with warm colour palette
Classrooms	Glazed partitions overlooking corridors; transparent design promoting collaboration
Acoustic treatment	Comprehensive soundproofing between rooms
Equipment	Contemporary numerically-controlled machinery
Workstations	Premium ergonomic workbenches
Supplementary facilities	Spacious theoretical classrooms; FabLab reserved for technicians

==== Technical infrastructure ====
Contractor Troger installed specialised fluid and pneumatic systems:

Technical systems
System	Function
Compressed air distribution	Individual workbench supply for component cleaning and pneumatic tool operation
Fluid management	Coolant and lubricant systems servicing CNC machinery
Temperature regulation	Controlled water temperature systems

=== ForPro Foundation ecosystem ===
The school resides within a larger 22,000 square metres (240,000 sq ft) ForPro Foundation building exclusively dedicated to vocational training. The foundation's mandate encompasses encouragement, support, enhancement, and promotion of vocational training for young people, their families, and enterprises throughout the Canton of Geneva.

ForPro Foundation facilities
Facility	Function	Status
PopUp	Reception area accessible to those seeking training information	Operational
LearningLab	Educational innovation space	Operational
FactoryLab	Industrial training facilities	Operational
FoodLab	Training restaurant accommodating approximately 15 apprentice cooks, bakers, pastry chefs, and servers	Operational
MakerLab	Fabrication and prototyping space	Scheduled inauguration by 2025
GrandLab	Multi-purpose training venue	Scheduled inauguration by 2025

This integrated ecosystem, aligned with the Swiss State Secretariat for Education, Research and Innovation's "Vocational Training 2030" initiative, addresses apprentice and enterprise requirements whilst maintaining public accessibility.

== Notable masters and faculty ==
Historical faculty
Name	Position	Tenure and distinction
Jean Odet	Master of the École de Blanc	Extended tenure; distinguished for rigorous movement construction training
Victor Terroux	Assistant master, École de Blanc	20 years' service; dismissed during 1862 crisis
Ch.-L. Schemidtmeyer	Master of complications (cadratures)	Workshop production contributed to school
Louis Boiteux	Master of finishing; subsequently cylinder escapements; Principal	Appointed aged 39
Jean Verdant (1833-1924)	Master of complications and remontoirs	1858-1893 (35 years); former student awarded first prize in blanc (1854); known as "Jean la Vigne" for his Plan-les-Ouates vineyard
Ami Robert	Master of finishing (repassage)	From May 1848; Neuchâtel origin; instruction in finishing simple watches, repeaters, and regulation
Pierre Amstutz	Director	Orchestrated relocation to Plan-les-Ouates; namesake of the Pierre Amstutz Fund supporting students in financial hardship

Administrative leadership during pivotal periods included M. Humbert-Brolliet (president during 1840s reforms) and M. Jean-Aug. Pouchoulin-Gravière (Principal until end of 1863).

== Notable alumni ==
The institution's pedagogical philosophy has cultivated a distinctive "Geneva Style" characterised by reverence for traditional decoration (anglage, perlage) combined with mechanical inventiveness.

Distinguished alumni
Name	Career	Distinction
Christophe Claret	Founder, Christophe Claret SA	Specialist in complex mechanisms
Roger Dubuis (1938-2017)	Founder, Roger Dubuis manufacture	Subsequently at Patek Philippe developing complex movements
Franck Muller	Founder, Franck Muller brand	Designated "Master of Complications"; graduated early 1980s; achievements in tourbillon and minute repeater miniaturisation attributed to school training
Laurent Ferrier	Founder, Laurent Ferrier	Graduated 1968; 37- year Patek Philippe tenure heading product development; 1979 24 Hours of Le Mans podium finisher
Antoine Preziuso	Founder, Antoine Preziuso	Recognised for artistic timepieces
Rexhep Rexhepi	Founder, Akrivia	Acclaimed for reviving traditional finishing techniques; credits school with instilling discipline essential to haute horlogerie
Jean-Marc Wiederrecht	Founder, Agenhor	Specialist in innovative complications mechanisms
Georges Dubois (1921-2025)	Career at Rolex and Patek Philippe	Class of 1941 valedictorian; recognised as the school's oldest known living alumnus at 103 during 2024 bicentennial; died June 2025
Pascal Mottier	Instructor	Alumnus returning to teach for 30 years; former students established several independent watch brands
Yves Mayor	Instructor	Alumnus returning to teach for 19 years; former students likewise founded independent brands

== Industry relations and philanthropy ==
=== Manufacturer partnerships ===
Relations between the school and major Geneva brands are reciprocally beneficial. Manufacturers including Rolex and Patek Philippe depend upon the school for qualified apprentices, frequently hiring graduates directly or extending internships during the third and fourth years.

Industry support encompasses equipment donations (movements, machinery) and professional expertise. Brand representatives regularly serve on examination juries, ensuring the Montre École satisfies commercial luxury standards.

=== Pierre Amstutz Fund ===
The Pierre Amstutz Fund, commemorating a former director who orchestrated the Plan-les-Ouates relocation, assists students experiencing financial hardship. Personal tool expenses (tweezers, loupes, screwdrivers) represent a considerable outlay.

Charity auctions hosted by Phillips during Geneva Watch Days generate funds benefiting the school. At the 2024 auction, a Konstantin Chaykin artwork realised CHF 21,000.

=== Economic significance ===
Swiss watch exports exceed CHF 25 billion annually. Geneva constitutes the capital of the haute horlogerie segment commanding premium price points. The school remains integral to sustaining Geneva Seal (Poinçon de Genève) certification, which mandates specific finishing techniques transmitted through institutional instruction. Without the workforce trained here, production volumes of Poinçon-grade timepieces would prove unsustainable.

== Legacy and influence ==
Across two centuries, the Geneva School of Watchmaking has proven instrumental in sustaining Switzerland's standing as the global centre of haute horlogerie.

Spheres of influence
Domain	Contribution
Craft preservation	Transmission of traditional Swiss watchmaking techniques across generations, encompassing ancestral Cabinotier traditions of the "Fabrique genevoise"
Educational standards	Development and international dissemination of standardised horological education methodologies
Innovation	Integration of traditional craftsmanship with Industry 4.0 manufacturing approaches
Quality certification	Contribution to establishment and enforcement of Geneva Seal quality criteria
Industry workforce	Provision of skilled personnel to major Swiss manufactures
Independent horology	Enabling graduate establishment of independent watchmaking ateliers

Institutional adaptability amid evolving circumstances, whilst maintaining fidelity to traditional methods, has secured Geneva's continued prominence in horological education. As articulated in the bicentennial publication, the school's mission remains to "guarantee tradition while driving innovation."

== See also ==
- Watchmaking
- Swiss made
- Horology
- Geneva Seal
- Canton of Geneva
- Vocational education
