= Marcel Golay =

Marcel Golay may refer to:

- Marcel Golay (astronomer) (1927–2015), Swiss astronomer from Geneva
- Marcel J. E. Golay (1902–1989), Swiss mathematician and physicist from Neuchâtel
