= Geneva Observatory =

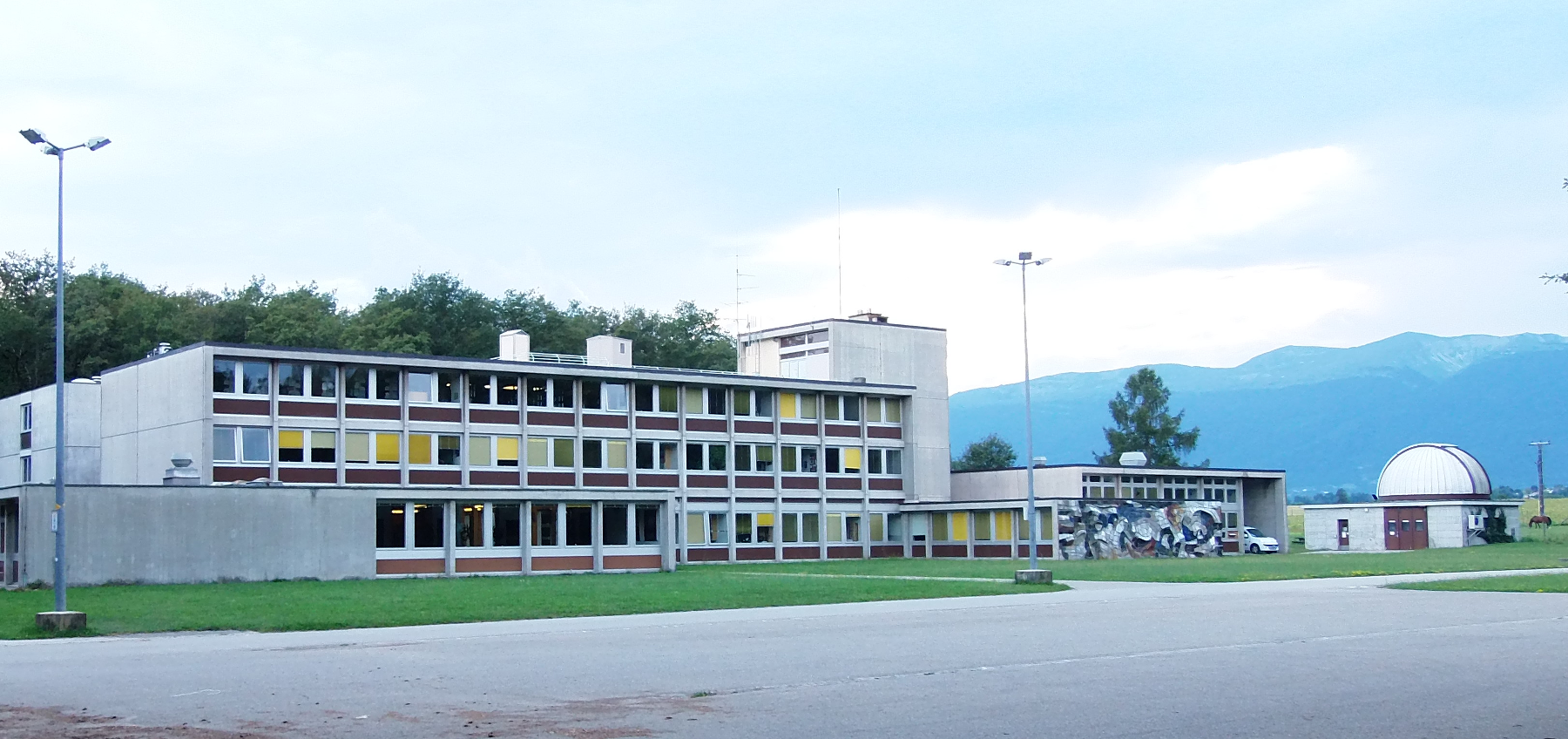
- The Geneva Observatory (August 2013)
- Alternative names: Geneva Observatory
- Organization: University of Geneva
- Observatory code: 517
- Location: Sauverny, Versoix, Canton of Geneva, Switzerland
- Coordinates: 46.309°N 6.135°E
- Established: 1967 (1772)
- Website: www.unige.ch/sciences/astro/en/
- Related media on Commons

The Geneva Observatory (French: Observatoire de Genève, German: Observatorium von Genf) is an astronomical observatory at Sauverny (CH) in the municipality of Versoix, Canton of Geneva, in Switzerland. It shares its buildings with the astronomy department of the École Polytechnique Fédérale de Lausanne. It has been active in discovering exoplanets, in stellar photometry, modelling stellar evolution, and has been involved in the European Space Agency's Hipparcos, INTEGRAL, Gaia, and Planck missions.

In 1995, the first exoplanet found orbiting a main-sequence star, 51 Pegasi b, was discovered by two scientists of the observatory, Michel Mayor and Didier Queloz, using the radial velocity method with the 1.9-metre telescope at Haute-Provence Observatory in France. Mayor and Queloz were awarded (half of) the Nobel Prize in Physics 2019 for this discovery.

In addition to a 1-metre telescope located at the French Haute-Provence Observatory (but owned by Geneva Observatory), the Geneva Observatory also operates the 1.2-metre Leonhard Euler Telescope. In cooperation with the Belgian University of Liège, it supports TRAPPIST, a 0.6-metre telescope specialized in observing comets and exoplanets. Both telescopes (Euler and TRAPPIST) are located at ESO's La Silla Observatory in northern Chile. In 2010, TRAPPIST was also involved in the controversial size-comparison of the two dwarf planets Eris and Pluto. The Geneva Observatory also participates in the Next-Generation Transit Survey, an international collaboration with several Universities from the United Kingdom as well as from Chile and Germany. Located at Paranal Observatory in Chile, the ground-based, robotic search facility for exoplanets began science operations in early 2015.

== History ==
(Old) Observatory of Geneva
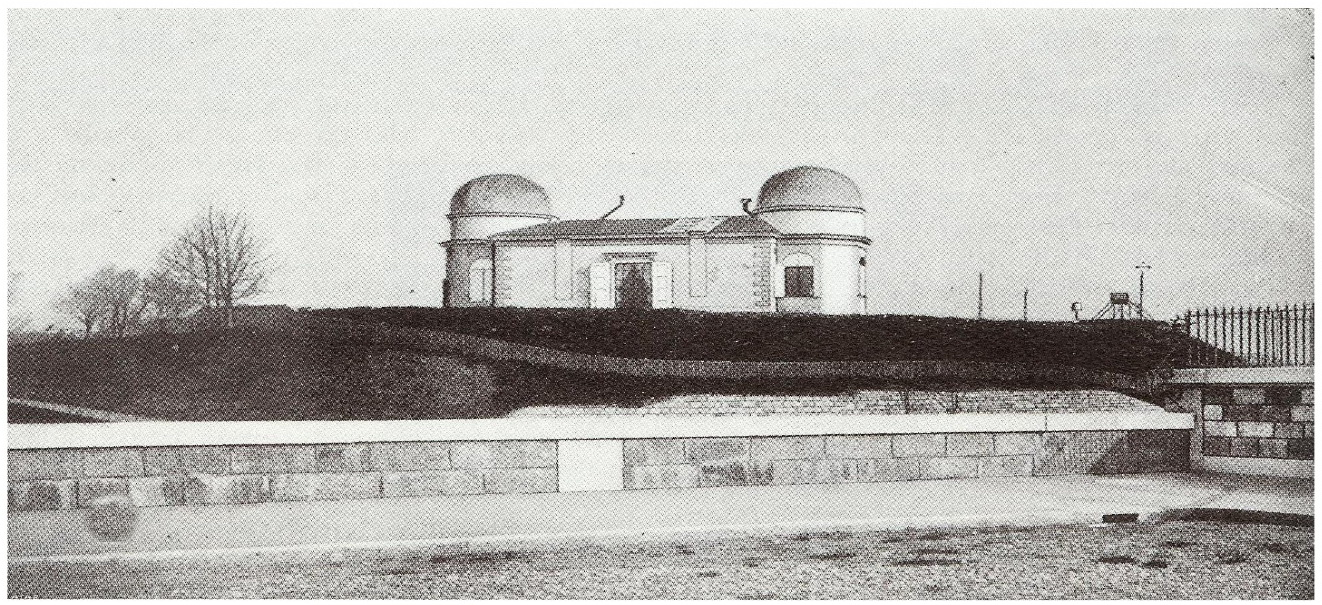
- Alternative names: Geneva Observatory
- Organization: University of Geneva
- Observatory code: 189
- Location: Geneva, Canton of Geneva, Switzerland
- Coordinates: 46.1998°N 6.1523°E
- Established: 1772
- Closed: 1969
- Website: www.unige.ch/sciences/astro/
- Related media on Commons

In the past, the Geneva Observatory participated in assessing and rating Swiss timepiece movements for accuracy. As marine navigation adopted the usage of mechanical timepieces for navigational aid, the accuracy of such timepieces became more critical. From this need developed an accuracy testing regime involving various astronomical observatories. In Europe, the Neuchatel Observatory, Geneva Observatory Besancon Observatory and Kew Observatory were examples of prominent observatories that tested timepiece movements for accuracy. The testing process lasted for many days, typically 45 days. Each movement was tested in 5 positions and 2 temperatures, in 10 series of 4 or 5 days each. The tolerances for error were much finer than any other standard, including the modern COSC standard. Movements that passed the stringent tests were issued a certification from the observatory called a Bulletin de Marche, signed by the Directeur of the Observatory. The Bulletin de Marche stated the testing criteria, and the actual performance of the movement. A movement with a Bulletin de Marche from an observatory became known as an Observatory Chronometer, and such were issued a chronometer reference number by the Observatory.

The role of the observatories in assessing the accuracy of mechanical timepieces was instrumental in driving the mechanical watchmaking industry toward higher and higher levels of accuracy. As a result, today high quality mechanical watch movements have an extremely high degree of accuracy. However, no mechanical movement could ultimately compare to the accuracy of the quartz movements being developed. In 1936, irregularities in the Earth's rotation speed due to unpredictable movements of air and water masses were discovered through the use of quartz clocks.This implied that the rotation of the Earth was an imprecise way of determining time. Accordingly, such chronometer certification ceased in the late 1960s and early 1970s with the advent of a new definition of the second.

== See also ==
- Claude Nicollier
- Emile Plantamour
- Gliese 86
- HD 209458
- Marc-Auguste Pictet
- Marcel Golay
- Methods of detecting exoplanets
- NGC 4349-127
- Plainpalais
- Science and technology in Switzerland
- Stéphane Udry
- Swiss Space Office
