= Gliese 86 =

Binary star system in the constellation Eridanus

- Location of Gliese 86 (circled in red)

Observation data Epoch J2000.0 Equinox ICRS
- Constellation: Eridanus
- Gliese 86 A
- Right ascension: 02^{h} 10^{m} 25.9182^{s}
- Declination: −50° 49′ 25.465″
- Apparent magnitude (V): 6.17
- Gliese 86 B
- Right ascension: 02^{h} 10^{m} 26.1144^{s}
- Declination: −50° 49′ 26.334″
- Apparent magnitude (V): 14.0

Characteristics

A
- Evolutionary stage: main sequence
- Spectral type: K1V
- U−B color index: 0.44
- B−V color index: 0.82

B
- Evolutionary stage: white dwarf
- Spectral type: DQ6

Astrometry

A
| Radial velocity (R_{v}) | +55.22±0.15 km/s |
| Proper motion (μ) | RA: +2,125.416 mas/yr Dec.: +637.975 mas/yr |
| Parallax (π) | 92.9251±0.0461 mas |
| Distance | 35.10 ± 0.02 ly (10.761 ± 0.005 pc) |
| Absolute magnitude (M_{V}) | 5.95 |

Orbit
| Primary | Gliese 86 A |
| Secondary | Gliese 86 B |
| Period (P) | ≈100 yr |
| Semi-major axis (a) | 23.7 au |
| Eccentricity (e) | 0.429 |
| Inclination (i) | 126.44° |
| Longitude of the node (Ω) | 234.2° |

Details

Gliese 86 A
| Mass | 0.83±0.05 M_{☉} |
| Radius | 0.79±0.03 R_{☉} |
| Luminosity | 0.41 L_{☉} |
| Surface gravity (log g) | 4.56±0.10 cgs |
| Temperature | 5,180±80 K |
| Metallicity [Fe/H] | −0.27±0.07 dex |
| Rotation | 30.0 days |
| Rotational velocity (v sin i) | 2.0±1.0 km/s |
| Age | 10±1 Gyr |

Gliese 86 B
| Mass | 0.5425 M_{☉} |
| Radius | 0.012 R_{☉} |
| Surface gravity (log g) | 8.02 cgs |
| Temperature | 8,180±200 K |

Other designations
- GJ 86, WDS J02104-5049
- Gliese 86A: CD−51°532, HD 13445, HIP 10138, HR 637, SAO 232658
- Gliese 86B: WD 0208-510

Database references
| SIMBAD | data |
- B
| Exoplanet Archive | data |
| ARICNS | data |

Gliese 86 (13 G. Eridani, HD 13445) is a K-type main-sequence star 35 light-years away in the constellation of Eridanus. It has been confirmed that a white dwarf orbits the primary star. In 1998 the European Southern Observatory announced that an extrasolar planet was also orbiting the star.

== Stellar components ==
The primary companion (Gliese 86 A) is a K-type main-sequence star of spectral type K1V. The characteristics in comparison to the Sun are 83% the mass, 79% the radius, and 50% the luminosity. The star has a close-orbiting massive Jovian planet.

Gliese 86 B is a white dwarf located around 21 AU from the primary star, making the Gliese 86 system one of the tightest binaries known to host an extrasolar planet. It was discovered in 2001 and initially suspected to be a brown dwarf, but high contrast observations in 2005 suggested that the object is probably a white dwarf, as its spectrum does not exhibit molecular absorption features which are typical of brown dwarfs. Assuming the white dwarf has a mass about half that of the Sun and that the linear trend observed in radial velocity measurements is due to Gliese 86 B, a plausible orbit for this star around Gliese 86 A has a semimajor axis of 18.42 AU and an eccentricity of 0.3974. When both stars were on the main sequence, the separation between the two stars was closer, at around 9 AU. More precise measurements for the white dwarf give it a mass of 55% the mass of the Sun and a temperature of around 8200 K. It is likely to have been an A5 star when on the main sequence.

== Planetary system ==
The planet Gliese 86 b was discovered by the Swiss 1.2 m Leonhard Euler Telescope operated by the Geneva Observatory. Such an object was formed from a protoplanetary disk that was truncated at 2 AU from the parent star.

The radial velocity measurements of Gliese 86 show a linear trend once the motion due to this planet are taken out. This may be associated with the orbital motion of the white dwarf companion.

The Gliese 86 A planetary system
| Companion (in order from star) | Mass | Semimajor axis (AU) | Orbital period (days) | Eccentricity | Inclination (°) | Radius |
|---|---|---|---|---|---|---|
| b | ≥6.588±0.018 M_{J} | 0.114340±0.000001 | 15.76480±0.00004 | 0.048±0.002 | — | — |

== See also ==
- List of exoplanets discovered before 2000 - Gliese 86b
