= Observatory chronometer =

An observatory chronometer is a timepiece that has passed stringent testing and a slate of accuracy tests. Thus, the "observatory trial" developed as the standard process for determining accuracy of timepiece movements. If the chronometer passed the stringent testing, it would be certified.

In the world of mechanical timepieces, accuracy is paramount. In the times before electronics, mechanical timepieces called marine chronometers were developed to a very high degree of accuracy for use in maritime navigation. To test the accuracy of such marine chronometers, watchmakers looked to a phalanx of astronomical observatories located in Western Europe to conduct assessments of timepieces.

== History ==
Once mechanical timepiece movements developed sufficient precision to allow for accurate marine navigation, there eventually developed what became known as "chronometer competitions" at the astronomical observatories located in western Europe. The Neuchatel Observatory, Geneva Observatory, Besancon Observatory, and Kew Observatory are prominent examples of observatories that certified the accuracy of mechanical timepieces. The observatory testing regime typically lasted for 30 to 50 days and contained accuracy standards that were far more stringent and difficult than modern standards such as those set by the COSC. When a movement passed the observatory, it became certified as an observatory chronometer and received a Bulletin de Marche from the observatory, stipulating the performance of the movement.

Of the millions of watches produced in Switzerland each year by all manufacturers in the mid-1960s, approximately 250,000 would receive official chronometer status (similar to what would be COSC standards today), and only a few hundred of the very best from the total production would be sent to an observatory for chronometer accuracy competitions. Watch movements that could compete for accuracy certification at the observatory had typically been specifically built for that purpose alone, they were slow beat movements, oscillating at from 18,000 to 21,600 bph, typically with oversized balance wheels, tweaked and prepared by the best watchmakers often for many years to render ultimate accuracy before they were submitted to the observatory. Typical examples of these specialized competition movements were the Peseux cal 260, the Zenith cal 135 and the Longines cal 360. Because of the development time to create and tweak such movements, watch manufacturers tended to enter very few movements at observatory competitions.

Because only very few movements were ever given the attention and manufacturing level necessary to pass the observatory standards, there are very few observatory chronometers in existence. Most observatory chronometers had movements so specialized to accuracy that they could never withstand being used as wristwatches in normal usage. They were useful only for accuracy competitions, and so never were sold to the public for usage.

However, in 1966 and 1967, Girard-Perregaux manufactured 662 wristwatches with the Calibre 32A High Frequency movements, which beat at 36,000 bph. All 662 movements were sent to the Bureaux Officiels de Contrôle de la marche des montres (B.O), who certified them as chronometers and issued Bulletins de Marche for each unit with the additional commendation of 'especially good results'.

Girard Perregaux selected 40 of these movements for further testing by the Neuchatel Observatory. These 40 movements were tested for another 45 days, it was these 40 that became the Girard Perregaux Observatory Chronometers.

Similarly in 1968, 1969 and 1970 Seiko had 226 wristwatches with its 4520 and 4580 Calibres certified as observatory chronometers. In both cases these observatory chronometers were then sold to the public for normal usage as wristwatches, and some examples may still be found today, although they are very rare. The Girard-Perregaux Calibre 32A movement that went into its Observatory Chronometers heralded a shift in watchmaking technology to higher frequency movements, and thus greater accuracy, that is followed today by watch manufacturers such as Seiko, Patek Philippe, Zenith, Audemars Piguet, Jaeger-LeCoultre, Chopard, Vacheron Constantin, Mathey-Tissot and such. The move to higher-frequency movements was necessitated by the challenges posed to the Swiss mechanical watch industry by the advent of the quartz watch movement in the late 1960s.

In recognition of a watchmaking achievement, Girard-Perregaux was granted the Centenary Certificate from the Neuchatel Observatory in 1967, the only time any manufacturer has ever been awarded such.

The observatory competitions ended with the advent of the quartz watch movement, in the late 1960s and early 1970s.

In 2009, the Watch Museum of Le Locle has launched a new chronometry contest based on ISO 3159 certification.

In 2017 the Observatory Chronometer Database (OCD) went online, which contains all mechanical timepieces ("chronometres-mecaniques") certified as observatory chronometers by the observatory in Neuchatel from 1945 to 1967, due to a successful participation in the competition which resulted in the issuance of a "Bulletin de Marche". All database entries are submissions to the wristwatch category ("chronometres-bracelet") at the observatory competition.

== See also ==
- Chronometer watch
- List of watch manufacturers
