= NGC 2423-3 =

Star in the constellation Puppis

Observation data Epoch J2000 Equinox ICRS
- Constellation: Puppis
- Right ascension: 07^{h} 37^{m} 09.23325^{s}
- Declination: −13° 54′ 23.9569″
- Apparent magnitude (V): 10.04

Characteristics
- Evolutionary stage: red giant branch
- Spectral type: G5IV-V/K2III

Astrometry
| Radial velocity (R_{v}) | 18.23±0.15 km/s |
| Proper motion (μ) | RA: -0.601 mas/yr Dec.: -3.625 mas/yr |
| Parallax (π) | 1.0746±0.0140 mas |
| Distance | 3,040 ± 40 ly (930 ± 10 pc) |

Details
| Mass | 2.03±0.14 M_{☉} |
| Radius | 17.71±1.04 R_{☉} |
| Luminosity | 131.8 L_{☉} |
| Surface gravity (log g) | 2.23±0.04 cgs |
| Temperature | 4534±12 K |
| Metallicity [Fe/H] | −0.08±0.01 dex |
| Rotational velocity (v sin i) | 2.19 km/s |
| Age | 1.02 Gyr |

Other designations
- BD−13 2130, TIC 288474555, TYC 5409-2156-1, GSC 05409-02156, 2MASS J07370922-1354239, NGC 2423 3, NGC 2423 MMU 3, NGC 2423 SN 4

Database references
| SIMBAD | data |

NGC 2423-3 is a red giant star approximately 3,040 light-years away in the constellation of Puppis. The star is part of the NGC 2423 open cluster (hence the name NGC 2423-3). The star has an apparent magnitude of 10 and an absolute magnitude of zero, with a mass of 2.4 times the Sun. In 2007, it was proposed that an exoplanet orbits the star, but this is now doubtful.

== Planetary system ==
NGC 2423-3 b is an exoplanet 10.6 times more massive than Jupiter. Only the minimum mass is known since the orbital inclination is not known, so it is likely to be a brown dwarf instead. The planet orbits at 2.1 AU, taking 1.956 years to orbit eccentrically around the star. Its eccentricity is about the same as Mercury, but less than Pluto. The planet has a semi-amplitude of 71.5 m/s.

This planet was discovered by Christophe Lovis and Michel Mayor in July 2007 by the radial velocity method. Lovis had also found three Neptune-mass planets orbiting HD 69830 in May 2006, also in Puppis.

However, a 2018 study with the same C. Lovis as an author found evidence that the radial velocity signal corresponding to the proposed planetary companion could be caused by stellar activity or stellar pulsations, and so the planet may not exist. Another study by the same team in 2023 confirms evidence for a stellar origin of the signal.

The NGC 2423-3 planetary system
| Companion (in order from star) | Mass | Semimajor axis (AU) | Orbital period (days) | Eccentricity | Inclination (°) | Radius |
|---|---|---|---|---|---|---|
| b (dubious) | >10.6 M_{J} | 2.10 | 714.3 ± 5.3 | 0.21 ± 0.07 | — | — |

== See also ==
- NGC 4349-127
- PSR B1620-26
