= Gliese 86 b =

Jovian planet orbiting Gliese 86 A

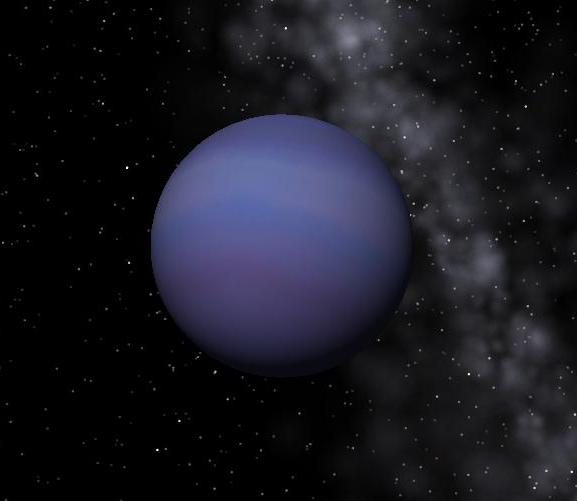
- The exoplanet Gliese 86 Ab (min mass ~4 MJ) rendered by Celestia

Discovery
- Discovered by: Mayor et al.
- Discovery site: France
- Discovery date: 24 November 1998
- Detection method: Doppler spectroscopy

Orbital characteristics
- Semi-major axis: 0.1177+0.0015 −0.0012 AU
- Eccentricity: 0.088±0.001
- Orbital period (sidereal): 15.77 ± 0.01 d
- Inclination: 50.00°±0.01°
- Longitude of ascending node: 73.33°+0.10° −0.11°
- Time of periastron: 2452806
- Argument of periastron: 359.99 ± 0.01
- Semi-amplitude: 376.7 ± 2.9
- Star: Gliese 86

Physical characteristics
- Mass: 5.90±0.01 M_{J}

Gliese 86 b, sometimes referred to as Gliese 86 A b (so as to distinguish the planet from companion star "B") and/or shortened to Gl 86 b, is an extrasolar planet approximately 35 light-years away in the constellation of Eridanus. The planet was discovered orbiting a K-type main-sequence star (Gliese 86 A) by French scientists in November 1998. The planet orbits very close to the star, completing an orbit in 15.78 days.

Preliminary astrometric measurements made with the Hipparcos space probe suggested the planet has an orbital inclination of 164.0° and a mass 15 times that of Jupiter, which would make the object a brown dwarf. However, further analysis suggests the Hipparcos measurements are not precise enough to reliably determine astrometric orbits of substellar companions, thus the orbital inclination and true mass of the candidate planet remain unknown.

== See also ==
- List of exoplanets discovered before 2000
