= Neuchâtel Observatory =

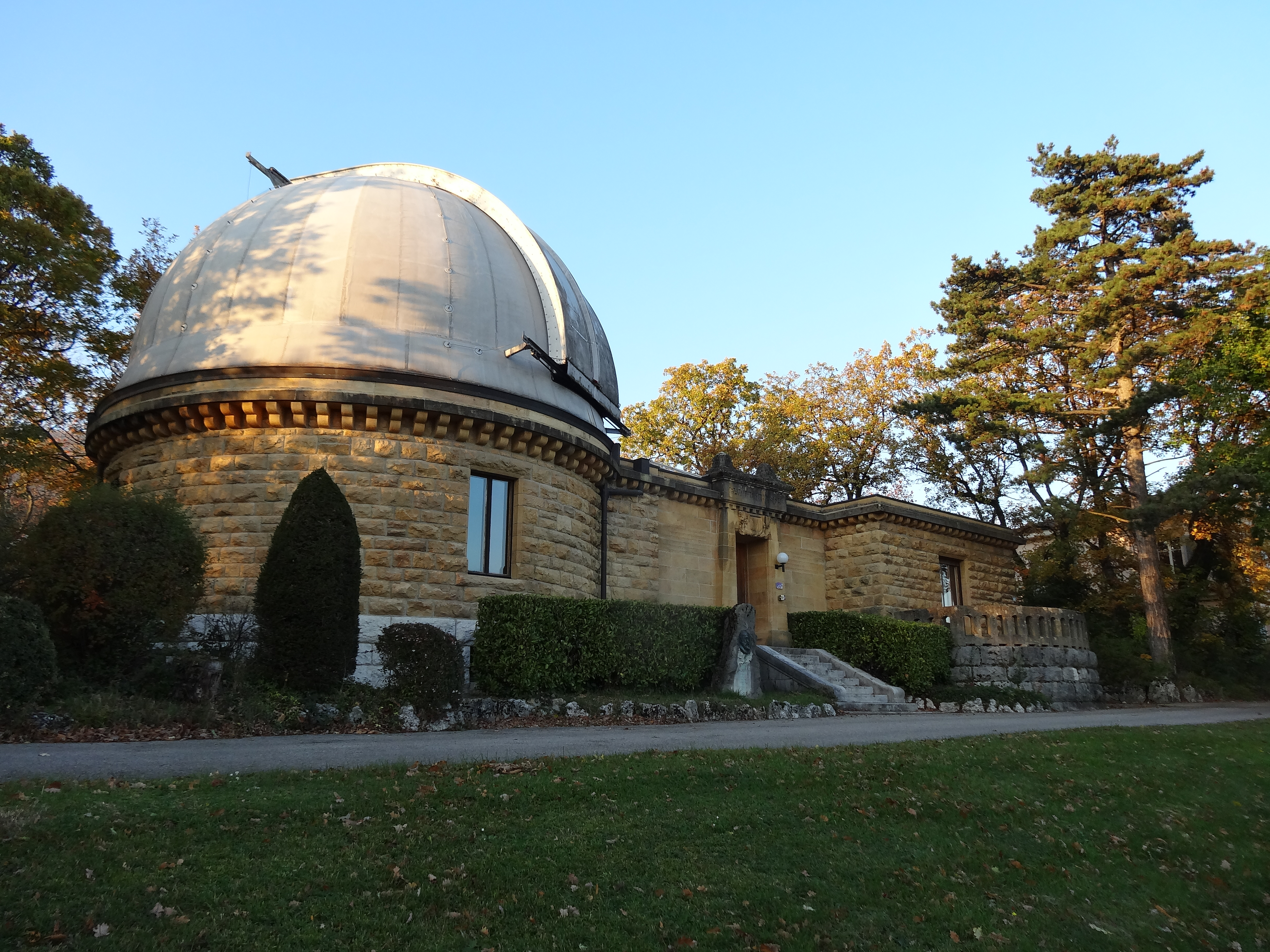
- Alternative names: Neuchatel Observatory
- Observatory code: 019
- Location: Neuchâtel, Canton of Neuchâtel, Switzerland
- Coordinates: 47.0000°N 6.9529°E
- Established: 1858
- Website: astrosurf.com/obs-ntl
- Related media on Commons

The Neuchâtel Observatory (French: Observatoire Cantonal de Neuchâtel) is an astronomical observatory funded by the Public Economy Department of the canton of Neuchâtel, Switzerland. It is located in the city of Neuchâtel and was founded in 1858. The first director was the German born, Swiss astronomer Adolphe Hirsch.

Besides astronomical observations, the Neuchâtel observatory also works with atomic clocks. Before 1967, one second was defined by the rotation of the earth, and thus Neuchâtel observatory calibrated clocks via observations. Now its telescope is used in a historical fashion by local amateur astronomers, while the calibration is done via atomic clocks.

== Description ==
In the past, the Neuchatel Observatory was known as the Observatoire Astronomique et Chronometrique de Neuchatel, in reference to the fact that it participated in assessing and rating Swiss timepiece movements for accuracy. As marine navigation adopted the usage of mechanical timepieces for navigational aid, the accuracy of such timepieces became more critical. From this need developed an accuracy testing regime involving various astronomical observatories. In Europe, the Neuchâtel Observatory, Geneva Observatory, Besançon Observatory and Kew Observatory were examples of prominent observatories that tested timepiece movements for accuracy. The testing process lasted for many days, typically 45 days. Each movement was tested in 5 positions and 2 temperatures, in 10 series of 4 or 5 days each. The tolerances for error were much finer than any other standard, including the modern COSC standard. Movements that passed the stringent tests were issued a certification from the observatory called a Bulletin de Marche, signed by the Directeur of the Observatory. The Bulletin de Marche stated the testing criteria, and the actual performance of the movement. A movement with a Bulletin de Marche from an observatory became known as an Observatory Chronometer, and such were issued a chronometer reference number by the Observatory.

The role of the observatories in assessing the accuracy of mechanical timepieces was instrumental in driving the mechanical watchmaking industry toward higher and higher levels of accuracy. As a result, today high quality mechanical watch movements have a high degree of accuracy. However, no mechanical movement could ultimately compare to the accuracy of the quartz movements being developed. In 1936, irregularities in the Earth's rotation speed due to unpredictable movements of air and water masses were discovered through the use of quartz clocks. This implied that the rotation of the Earth was an imprecise way of determining time. Accordingly, such chronometer certification ceased in the late 1960s and early 1970s with the advent of a new definition of the second.

In 2017 the Observatory Chronometer Database (OCD) went online, which contains all mechanical timepieces ("chronometres-mecaniques") certified as observatory chronometers by the observatory in Neuchatel from 1945 to 1967, due to a successful participation in the competition which resulted in the issuance of a "Bulletin de Marche". All database entries are submissions to the wristwatch category ("chronometres-bracelet") at the observatory competition.
