= NGC 2423 =

Open cluster in the constellation Puppis

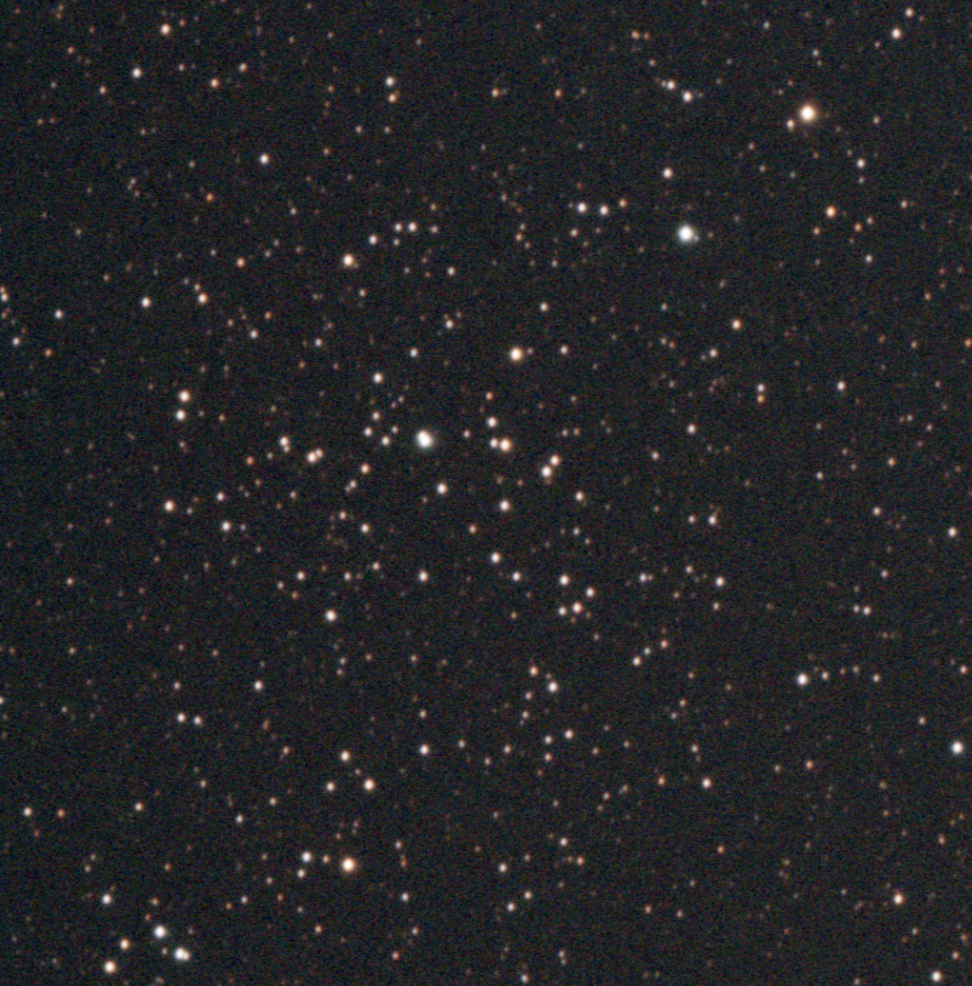
- NGC 2423, seen in 2025

Observation data
- Right ascension: 07^{h} 37^{m} 06.7^{s}
- Declination: −13° 52′ 17″
- Distance: 2,498 ly (766.0 pc)
- Apparent magnitude (V): 6.7
- Absolute magnitude (V): −2.72
- Apparent dimensions (V): 12′

Physical characteristics
- Radius: 15
- Other designations: h 3090, GC 1552, OCL 592

Associations
- Constellation: Puppis

NGC 2423 is an open cluster of stars in the constellation of Puppis. It was discovered on March 19, 1786 by William Herschel. It contains 50-60 stars. NGC 2423-3 is a red giant star contained in the cluster. It is located near Messier 47 and Messier 46. NGC 2423 has no actual connection to either of these, being located 943 parsecs away from M 47.

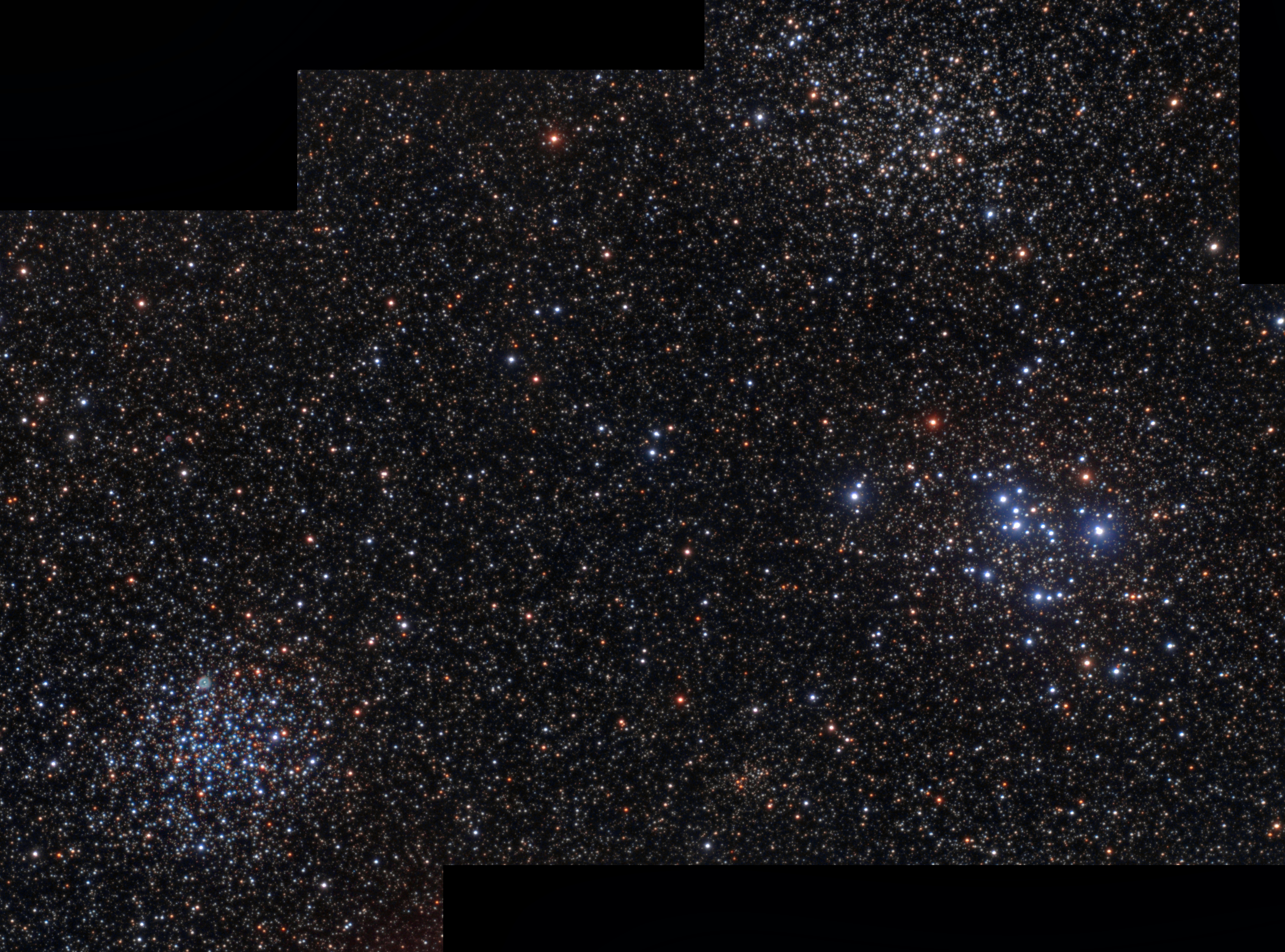
NGC 2423 located in the top-right, above Messier 47, Messier 46 at left, NGC 2425 below M 47
