= NGC 4349 =

Open cluster in the constellation Crux

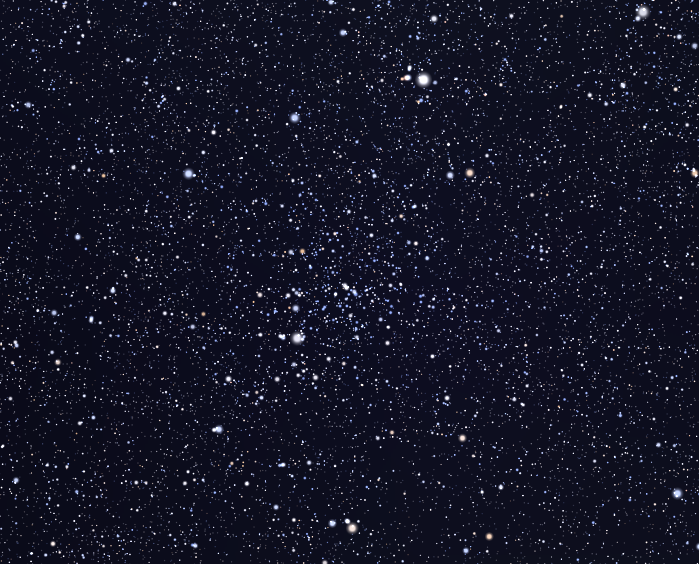
- NGC 4349

Observation data (J2000 epoch)
- Right ascension: 12^{h} 24^{m} 08^{s}
- Declination: −61° 52′ 18″
- Distance: 7,090 ly (2,176 pc)
- Apparent magnitude (V): 7.4
- Apparent dimensions (V): 12'

Physical characteristics
- Mass: 4,400 M_{☉}
- Estimated age: 250 million years
- Other designations: Cr 255, Mel 110

Associations
- Crux

NGC 4349 is an open cluster in the constellation Crux. It was discovered by James Dunlop in 1826. It is located approximately 7,000 light years away from Earth.

== Characteristics ==
There are 390 probable member stars within the angular radius of the cluster and 129 within the central part of the cluster. The tidal radius of the cluster is 17.8 - 22.8 parsecs (58 - 75 light years) and represents the average outer limit of NGC 4349, beyond which a star is unlikely to remain gravitationally bound to the cluster core. One blue straggler has been detected in the cluster. There are four Cepheid variables in the direction of the cluster, among them R and T Crucis, which, however, are not members of the cluster. R Crucis lies 16 arcminutes from the centre of the open cluster NGC 4349, which is beyond the outer limit of the cluster, and is estimated to be nearly 1 kpc closer to Earth than the cluster. The cluster has subsolar metallicity (−0.12 ± 0.06).

The giant star NGC 4349 No. 127 (vmag. 10.82 and with mass 3.0 M_{☉}) displays periodic radial velocity variations caused by intrinsic stellar variability, formerly thought to be caused by an orbiting brown dwarf companion.
