= Roger Dubuis =

Swiss luxury watch brand

Manufacture Roger Dubuis SA

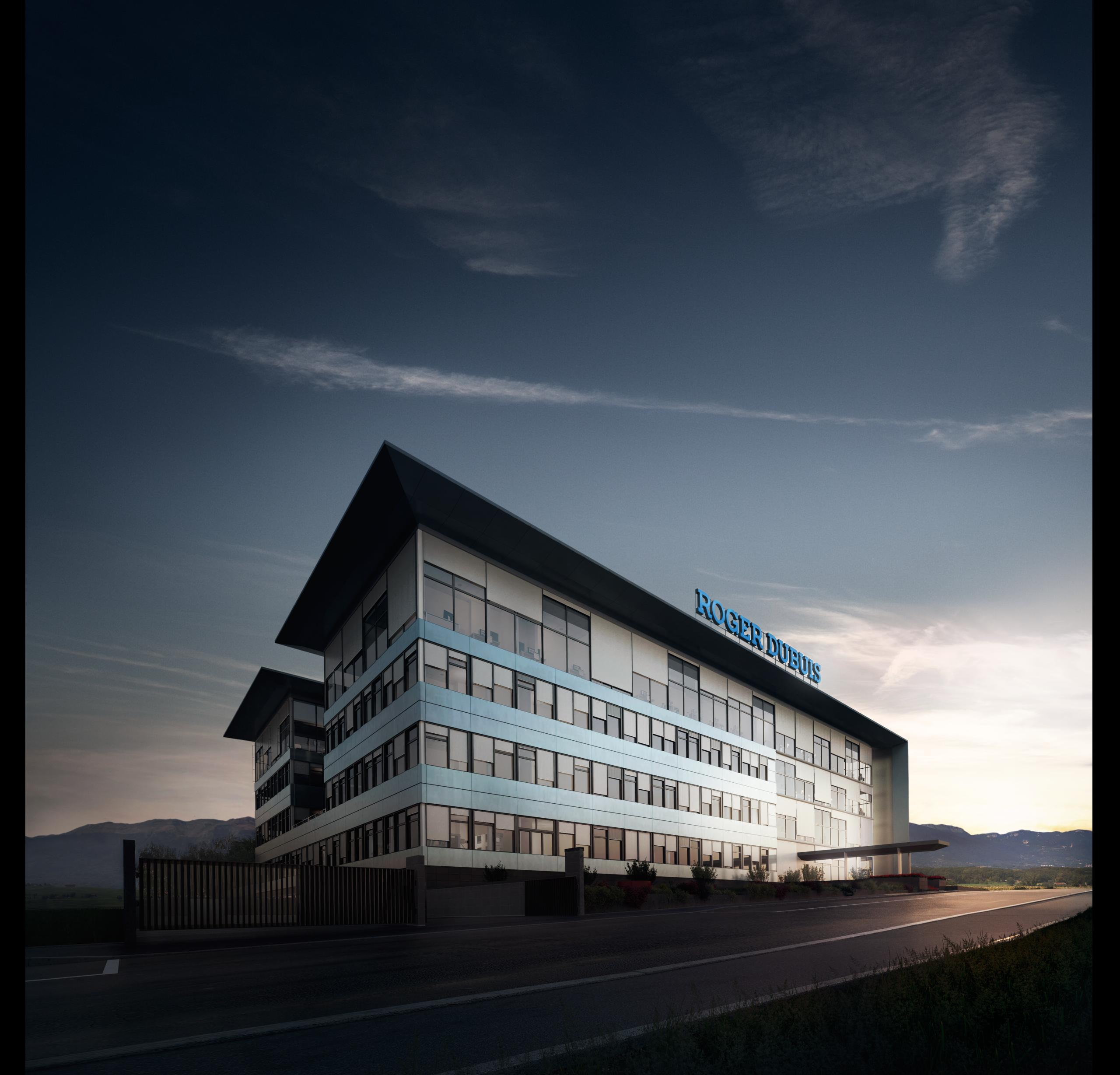
- The Roger Dubuis headquarters and manufacture in Meyrin, near Geneva
- Type: Société anonyme (Subsidiary)
- Industry: Watchmaking
- Founded: 1995; 31 years ago in Geneva, Switzerland
- Founders: Roger Dubuis; Carlos Dias
- Headquarters: Meyrin, Canton of Geneva, Switzerland
- Key people: David Chaumet (CEO)
- Products: Luxury watches
- Owner: Richemont
- Parent: Richemont
- Website: rogerdubuis.com

Roger Dubuis, officially Manufacture Roger Dubuis SA, is a Swiss luxury watch manufacturer founded in 1995 and based in Meyrin, in the Canton of Geneva. The company specialises in mechanically complex timepieces and produces most of the components of its movements in-house. Nearly all of its watches carry the Poinçon de Genève (Geneva Seal). Since 2016 it has been a wholly owned subsidiary of the Richemont group.

The company was created by the watchmaker Roger Dubuis (1938–2017) and the Portuguese-born entrepreneur and designer Carlos Dias. Initially known for classically styled watches rooted in the Geneva watchmaking tradition, the brand later adopted an assertively contemporary identity built around its Excalibur collection and partnerships with Lamborghini and Pirelli, describing its output as "expressive high watchmaking".

== History ==
=== Origins and founding (1980s–1995) ===
Roger Dubuis, born in 1938, began his career in the late 1950s at Longines in Saint-Imier, mainly in the after-sales department, before joining Patek Philippe in Geneva, where he spent about fourteen years in the complications workshop. He left in 1980 to open his own workshop, restoring antique watches and clocks for collectors, auction houses and brands.

In the late 1980s, together with watchmaker Jean-Marc Wiederrecht, he developed a perpetual calendar module with a double retrograde display, commissioned by the New York jeweller Harry Winston. The watch was presented at Baselworld in 1989; this bi-retrograde display later became a signature of the Roger Dubuis brand. It was in Geneva during these years that Dubuis met Carlos Dias, with whom he went into partnership.

In 1995, the two men founded the company under the name SOGEM SA (Société Genevoise des Montres); its watches and catalogues carried the words "Roger Dubuis Horloger Genevois". The corporate name was officially changed to "Manufacture Roger Dubuis SA" in 1999.

=== Early collections (1995–2000) ===
From the outset the brand offered two lines: the Sympathie, with a cushion-shaped case often fitted with the bi-retrograde display, and the Hommage, a tribute to past watchmakers with a round case influenced by 1950s Patek Philippe chronographs. The earliest watches were certified with the Poinçon de Genève and tested as chronometers at the Besançon Observatory. Around the turn of the 2000s the brand released bolder collections — Too Much, Much More, Follow Me and Golden Square — characterised by large cases and unusual shapes.

=== The manufacture and the Excalibur collection (2001–2007) ===
The brand's first in-house movements appeared from 1999, all carrying the Geneva Seal. Its integrated manufacture was built in Meyrin in 2001 and inaugurated in 2002. In 2005 the brand launched its flagship Excalibur collection and unveiled its first skeleton calibre, developing two exclusive movements: the RD01SQ double flying tourbillon skeleton, presented as a world première, and the RD08 minute-repeater tourbillon. By 2006 the company claimed 28 proprietary calibres, all Geneva Seal–certified.

=== Acquisition by Richemont (2008–2016) ===
Roger Dubuis joined the Richemont group in 2008, when the group took a controlling interest; Richemont acquired full ownership in 2016, making the brand a wholly owned subsidiary. Before the 2008 downturn, the manufacture employed roughly 450 people and produced about 25,000 watches a year for revenue exceeding 100 million Swiss francs; output was sharply reduced afterwards, stabilising at around 5,000 watches a year by the late 2010s.

=== Death of the founder (2017) ===
Roger Dubuis, who had stepped back from operational management in the early 2000s but remained a brand ambassador, died on 14 October 2017 at the age of 80.

=== Contemporary repositioning and partnerships (2012–2023) ===
During the 2010s the brand asserted a contemporary identity centred on mechanical aesthetics, skeletonisation and large cases with proprietary triple lugs. It launched feminine and sporting collections (La Monégasque in 2011, Velvet and Pulsion in 2012) and entered into motorsport partnerships, notably with Lamborghini Squadra Corse and Pirelli, as well as the design studio Italdesign. Ambassadors of the period included the boxer Canelo Álvarez and artists such as Dr. Woo, Hajime Sorayama and Liu Wei. Chief executive Nicola Andreatta left in 2023, with Emmanuel Perrin serving as interim CEO.

=== Thirtieth anniversary and return to its roots (2024–2026) ===
David Chaumet, who had joined Roger Dubuis in 2008 and later led Baume & Mercier, was appointed chief executive in June 2024. At Watches and Wonders 2024 the brand presented the Orbis in Machina, a central flying tourbillon powered by the RD115 calibre, and unveiled with Lamborghini a split-seconds chronograph shown during Monterey Car Week.

For its thirtieth anniversary in 2025, the brand undertook a "return to its roots" emphasising the legacy of its founder. It released the Excalibur Grande Complication, limited to eight pieces and combining a flying tourbillon, minute repeater and bi-retrograde perpetual calendar, together with the 40 mm pink-gold Excalibur Biretrograde Calendar. At Dubai Watch Week it also presented the Hommage La Placide, a 38 mm watch with a bi-retrograde display and perpetual calendar. For 2026 the brand grouped its novelties under the theme "Movements of the Sky", with eight models centred on perpetual and retrograde calendars, including a bi-retrograde perpetual calendar driven by the new RD850 calibre, alongside a feminine line named "Lady of the Lake".

== Leadership ==
The company has had several chief executives. Recent holders of the role include Nicola Andreatta (until 2023), Emmanuel Perrin (interim, 2023) and David Chaumet, appointed in June 2024.

== Manufacture and craftsmanship ==
=== Integrated production ===
Roger Dubuis is one of the few Swiss watchmakers to design, develop and manufacture in-house most of the components of its calibres, from the bare baseplate to the finishing. The brand states that it has developed more than 40 exclusive calibres since its founding.

=== Geneva Seal ===
Almost all Roger Dubuis watches carry the Poinçon de Genève, a certification that applies not only to the movement but to the entire watch head and imposes strict requirements on architecture, components and finishing. According to specialist press, only a very small share of Switzerland's annual watch production qualifies for the seal, which the brand presents as a distinguishing feature. Calibres are finished by hand using traditional techniques (anglage, perlage, polishing), including on contemporary materials such as carbon.

=== Notable calibres ===
The manufacture produces a wide range of mechanical movements, hand- or self-winding, from three-hand calibres to grand complications. Roger Dubuis makes only flying tourbillons, in which the cage is anchored at a single point. Exclusive calibres include:

- RD01 / RD01SQ — skeleton double flying tourbillon with differential, presented as a world première in 2005.
- RD08 — minute-repeater flying tourbillon.
- RD101 "Quatuor" — the first movement with four sprung balances linked by five differentials, designed to compensate for the effects of gravity (the "Gravity Compensation Concept"); it features the brand's first power-reserve indicator and is the subject of three patents. It powers the Excalibur Quatuor introduced in 2013.
- RD103SQ — double sprung balances with differential, the first movement co-developed with Lamborghini Squadra Corse.
- RD105SQ and RD108SQ — skeleton double flying tourbillon with differential.
- RD505SQ, RD508SQ, RD509SQ, RD510SQ, RD512SQ — skeleton flying tourbillons.
- RD107 — minute repeater.
- RD0829 — a grand complication combining a minute repeater, flying tourbillon, instantaneous perpetual calendar with in-line windows and dual time zone.
- RD115 — central monotourbillon, used notably in the Orbis in Machina and the Knights of the Round Table Monotourbillon.
- RD520 — automatic flying tourbillon with dial-side micro-rotor; RD540 — flying tourbillon with instantaneous large date; RD580 — flying tourbillon coupled with a single-button chronograph and a platinum micro-rotor.
- RD630 — automatic "12° Balance" calibre; RD77, RD620, RD622 — automatic calibres with micro-rotor.
- RD780 — in-house integrated flyback chronograph calibre, Geneva Seal–certified, fitted to the Excalibur Spider Flyback Chronograph.
- RD820SQ — automatic skeleton with micro-rotor; RD821 and RD830 — automatic calibres (hours-minutes; with date).
- RD850 — bi-retrograde perpetual calendar calibre introduced in 2026.

== Collections ==
=== Excalibur ===
Launched in 2005, Excalibur is the brand's flagship collection; according to the company its name was inspired by a medieval sword given to Carlos Dias. Redesigned from 2020 with cleaner lines, it is offered in monotourbillon, double-tourbillon and monobalancier versions and underpins the sporting Excalibur Spider series and the automotive collaborations.

=== Knights of the Round Table ===
First presented in 2013, the Knights of the Round Table collection is a métiers d'art line illustrating the Arthurian legend: its hour markers depict hand-sculpted miniature knights arranged around a central table.

=== Historical collections ===
- Sympathie (from 1995–1996): cushion-shaped case, often with bi-retrograde displays.
- Hommage (1995–1996): classic round case, a tribute to past watchmakers.
- Too Much, Much More, Follow Me, Golden Square, King Square: boldly designed 2000s collections.
- La Monégasque (2011): a line inspired by the world of gaming and risk.
- Velvet (2012): the brand's first feminine collection, with a gem-set case.
- Pulsion (2012): a sporting line.

== Partnerships and ambassadors ==
Since the mid-2010s Roger Dubuis has collaborated with Lamborghini Squadra Corse and Pirelli in motorsport, producing models such as the Excalibur Aventador S, the Excalibur Huracán and various Spider editions; the brand was also a sponsor of the Lamborghini Super Trofeo championship. Its ambassadors and artistic collaborators have included boxer Canelo Álvarez and artists such as Dr. Woo, Hajime Sorayama and Liu Wei.

== Economic data ==
Roger Dubuis is a privately held company owned by Richemont, which does not report its revenue or headcount separately. Specialist-press estimates suggest annual production of around 5,000 watches and a workforce of several hundred, following a peak of roughly 25,000 watches and 450 employees before 2008.
