= Marcel Golay (astronomer) =

Swiss astronomer

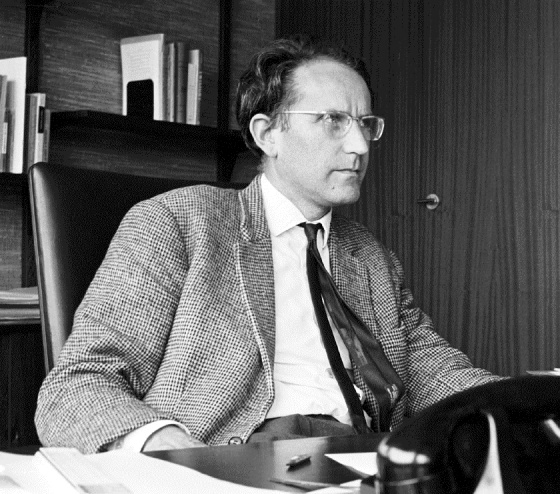
Marcel Golay at Geneva Observatory in 1966

Marcel Golay (French: [gɔlɛ]; 6 September 1927 – 9 April 2015) was a Swiss astronomer, professor at Geneva University and the eighth director of the Geneva Observatory from 1956 to 1992. Golay was a member of the International Astronomical Union and president of several of its commissions including "Stellar Classification" and "Astronomical Photometry and Polarimetry". In 1991, University of Basel awarded him an honorary professorship. Asteroid 3329 Golay is named after him.

== Honors and awards ==
Asteroid 3329 Golay – an 18-kilometer-sized member of the Eos family, that was discovered by Paul Wild at Zimmerwald Observatory in 1985 – was named in his honor. The official naming citation was published by the Minor Planet Center on 1 September 1993 (M.P.C. 22497). He was awarded the Prix Jules Janssen by the Société astronomique de France in 1986.
