= Geneva Seal =

Quality seal for watches made in Geneva

The Geneva Seal (English), Poinçon de Genève (French), or Genfer Siegel (German) is the official seal of the City and Canton of Geneva, Switzerland. When a variation of the official seal is applied to wristwatch movements, the Geneva Seal is the quality seal of the Watchmaking School of Geneva and it has an official purpose as defined by the law.

The Geneva seal in horology (watches), is a certification reserved for wrist watch movements made in the City or Canton of Geneva. Although it is concerned mainly with the finishing and decoration of the watch movement, it is considered a high accolade in the industry. Precision testing, though not mandatory, is an option in the inspection process.

Post Tenebras Lux (after the darkness, light) the Seal of the Canton of Geneva which is used as the mark for the Poinçon de Genève.

== Etymology ==
The term is often mistakenly translated from the French as the "Geneva hallmark", as the word Poinçon means "punch" and is the word used for hallmark. However, a hallmark is an official mark attesting to the fineness of a precious metal object. In this context the German translation of hallmark, which is "stempel" or "stamp" may be helpful to foster an understanding of and distinguish the terms. The motif of the Geneva Seal is the seal of the Canton of Geneva. This becomes evident when one translates its name from the German. The official languages of Switzerland are German, French, Italian and Romantch (used in that order). But this issue about the translation is still a matter of debate because the term used by Timelab is the "Hallmark of Geneva". (Timelab is an organization which is composed of a centre for certifications (Hallmark of Geneva, COSC, Sport time-keeping) and a centre for Research and Development.)

== General overview ==
The Geneva Seal is the quality seal of the City and Canton of Geneva. It is a certification reserved for wrist and pocket watch movements made in the City or Canton of Geneva. Although it is concerned mainly with the finishing and decoration of the watch movement, it is considered a high accolade in the industry. Precision testing, however, is an option in the inspection process. Among the Geneva watchmakers who regularly submit their movements for the Geneva Seal certification are: Cartier, Chopard, Roger Dubuis, Vacheron Constantin, Louis Vuitton and Ateliers deMonaco.

This quality seal has been authorized since the enactment of the enabling regulation in 1886. Pursuant to the law only watches may carry the seal. The seal is concerned with the quality and finishing of the watch movement, although it also addresses the precision of the timekeeping mechanism. The seal is awarded to watches only after an "official examination" to discern whether the watch movement possesses all the required characteristics required for the accolade. The characteristics require, at a minimum, that the watch was made in or made on commission by a qualified Genevoise craftsman from the City or Canton of Geneva.

A somewhat similar certification, the Qualité Fleurier or Fleurier Quality, which was begun on June 5, 2001, includes precision testing. Participants in this certification process include: Bovet Fleurier, Chopard, Parmigiani Fleurier and Vaucher Manufacture Fleurier.

== The law ==
=== The enabling statute ===
There are actually two pieces of legislation concerning the Geneva seal. The first is entitled Loi sur le contrôle facultatif des montres (law on the voluntary inspection of watches [from Geneva]). This is the enabling statute.

=== The specific regulations ===
The second piece of legislation is entitled Règlement sur le contrôle facultatif des montres de Genève (Regulations for the Voluntary Inspection of Watches from Geneva); these are the regulations setting out the criteria for the award of the seal. These laws have undergone revisions since their initial enactments. The latest revisions were in January 1994.

== The methodology of the inspection system ==
=== The Office of Inspection at the School of Watchmaking ===
The methodology of the voluntary inspection requires that the watches are submitted to the Geneva Watchmaking School. The "Office for the Voluntary Inspection of Watches from Geneva" has, as a matter of law, been located at the school since the inception of the seal.

=== Background of the inspectors ===
In order to avoid the appearance of impropriety the inspectors must be Swiss citizens, must take an oath to discharge the duties of their office with fidelity and must not have any conflicts of interest, i.e.: they must not trade in watches. These obligations on the inspectors serve to warrant the proper conduct of the inspections and the awarding of the seals.

== The key points of the enabling statute ==
The original enabling statute, Loi sur le contrôle facultatif des montres (Law on the Voluntary Control of Watches), was enacted on November 6, 1886, and was amended on May 27, 1891, November 15, 1958, and December 9, 1959.

It established, in the canton of Geneva, an office for the voluntary inspection of the watches from Geneva at the School of Horology to examine and mark watch movements. In general, the watches may be marked if following an examination, they are recognized to have all qualities of good workmanship likely to ensure a uniform rate and durability and whose work, at a minimum was done on commission by workmen living the canton of Geneva.

The actual regulations, requirements or criteria are contained in another piece of legislation. These regulation contain the 12 criteria required for a movement to obtain the seal. In the text of the regulation, dated December 22, 1993, effective January 6, 1994, the requirements or specifications are set forth. Only mechanical watch works which were assembled and regulated in the city or canton of Geneva may be submitted; the manufacturer must certify this fact. There are twelve (12) criteria for the quality of all components and their finishing.

The workmanship of all of the movement's components, including those of complications must meet the requirements of the office of optional inspection. Only upon fulfillment of all the criteria may the watch receive the seal.

== The translated text of the Specific Regulations for Geneva Seal Watch Movements ==
December 22, 1993 (effective January 6, 1994)

Rules on the Voluntary Inspection of Watches from Geneva

The COUNCIL of STATE of the Republic and canton of Geneva, considering the law of November 6, 1886, instituting in the canton an office of voluntary control of the watches from Geneva; considering its regulation of this day concerning the organization of the office of voluntary control of the watches of Geneva, decrees:

=== Art. 1 Admission requirements ===
1 The mechanical movements of watches constructed in accordance with the best practices of the watch industry and whose construction is in conformity with the directions given to the controller to set the minimum level required for good workmanship are punched.

2 It is required that the assembly and adjustment are carried out in the canton of Geneva. The guarantee of work carried out is attested by a signed form by the submitter or manufacturers. This form must accompany the movements presented for inspection.

3 Movements carrying the punch of Geneva must be numbered.

=== Art. 2 Doubtful Cases ===
The superintendents assist the inspector in the case of dubious watches presented for inspection

=== Art. 3 Technical Requirements ===
1 The good workmanship of all the parts of the caliber, including those of the additional mechanisms, must be in conformity with the requirements of the office of voluntary inspection of the watches from Geneva. Steel parts must have polished angles and their visible surfaces smoothed down. Screw heads must be polished, with their slots and rims chamfered.

Jewelling

2 The entire movement must jeweled with ruby jewels set in polished holes, including the going train and escape wheel. On the bridge side, the jewels must be olive-drilled with polished sinks. The jewel of the center wheel on the main plate is not required. By way of clarification, a friction bearing (jewel) cut with an olive profile is one where the inside surface is rounded or beveled at the top and bottom of the hole providing a reservoir for lubricating oil.

Regulating Systems

3 The hairspring should be pinned in a grooved plate with a stud having a rounded collar and cap. Mobile studs are permitted.

4 Split or fitted indexes are allowed with a holding system except in extra-thin calibers where the holding system is not required.

5 Regulating systems with balance with radius of variable gyration are allowed insofar as they meet the conditions of article 3, subparagraph 1.

Wheels

6 The wheels of the going train must be chamfered above and below and have a polished sink. In wheels 0.15 mm thick or less, a single chamfer is allowed on the bridge side.

7 In wheel assemblies, the pivot shanks and the faces of the pinion leaves must be polished.

Escapement

8 The escape wheel has to be light, not more than 0.16 mm thick in large calibers and 0.13 mm in calibers under 18 mm, and its locking-faces must be polished.

9 The angle traversed by the pallet lever is to be limited by fixed banking walls and not pins or studs.

Shock Protection

10 Shock protected movements are accepted.

Winding Mechanism

11 The ratchet and crown wheels must be finished in accordance with registered patterns.

Springs

12 Wire springs are not allowed.

=== Art. 4 Personnel in charge of inspection ===
The controller and his agents are only in charge of punching. They must comply to the decisions of the oversight commission.

=== Art. 5 Punching ===
1 The punch is affixed on the mainplate and one of the bridges, except if that is a technical impossibility. The site can vary according to the caliber.

2 By exception, it can be affixed on a finished movement.

=== Art. 6 Requirements for obtaining a rate bulletin ===
1 At the request of the manufacturer, a rate bulletin can be obtained in complement to the Geneva seal.

2 Criteria of obtaining a rate bulletin are defined according to the NIHS standard 95-11 ( a/k/a ISO 3159) for chronometers.

3 These bulletins are obtained through the Geneva office of COSC.

=== Art. 7 Chronometers ===
The watches having successfully undergone the rate tests can claim the title chronometer.

=== Art. 8 Rescinding Clause ===
The regulations on the voluntary inspection of watches from Geneva, of April 5, 1957, is repealed.

=== The name Geneva on watch dials ===
Apart from the Geneva Seal, some watches carry the name Geneva or Genève on their dials. The use of the name Geneva on a watch dial is governed by the Bureau de contrôle des Montres de Genève. To wear this badge, a watch must be a Swiss watch and at least one of the major operations in fabrication— either assembly of the movement or insertion of the movement into the case— must have been performed in the Swiss canton of Genève so that at least 50% of the total cost of production is incurred there.
