= NGC 4349-127 =

Star in the constellation Crux

Observation data Epoch J2000 Equinox ICRS
- Constellation: Crux
- Right ascension: 12^{h} 24^{m} 35.47095^{s}
- Declination: −61° 49′ 11.8614″
- Apparent magnitude (V): 10.82

Astrometry
| Radial velocity (R_{v}) | −11.20±0.21 km/s |
| Proper motion (μ) | RA: −7.848(12) mas/yr Dec.: −0.207(13) mas/yr |
| Parallax (π) | 0.5348±0.0143 mas |
| Distance | 6,100 ± 200 ly (1,870 ± 50 pc) |

Details
| Mass | 3.01±0.24 M_{☉} |
| Radius | 37.97±2.56 R_{☉} |
| Luminosity | 575.4 L_{☉} |
| Surface gravity (log g) | 1.78±0.05 cgs |
| Temperature | 4417±12 K |
| Metallicity [Fe/H] | −0.17±0.02 dex |
| Rotational velocity (v sin i) | 4.81 km/s |
| Age | 0.32 Gyr |

Other designations
- TIC 450417907, TYC 8975-2606-1, GSC 08975-02606, 2MASS J12243547-6149120, NGC 4349 127, NGC 4349 MMU 127

Database references
| SIMBAD | data |

NGC 4349-127 is a probable red giant star approximately 6,100 light-years away in the constellation of Crux. It is a member of the open cluster NGC 4349 (hence the name NGC 4349-127). Its mass is estimated at 3.9 times Solar, and its age is about 200 million years.

In 2007, this star was found to have a substellar companion. NGC 4349-127 b is a brown dwarf (based on its mass) with nearly 20 times the mass of Jupiter. Within an eccentricity of about 0.19, its orbit is moderately elliptical, about the same as Mercury in the Solar System. It orbits its host star at a distance of 2.38 AU in a period of 677.8 days. This object was discovered by Christophe Lovis and Michel Mayor of the Geneva Observatory using the radial velocity technique.

However, a 2018 study with the same C. Lovis as an author found that the radial velocity signal corresponding to the proposed substellar companion was most likely caused by stellar activity, and thus the companion does not exist. Another study by the same team in 2023 also confirms the stellar origin of the signal. A 2024 study also found the radial velocity signal to be caused by non-radial oscillations.

== See also ==
- NGC 2423-3
