= Besançon Astronomical Observatory =

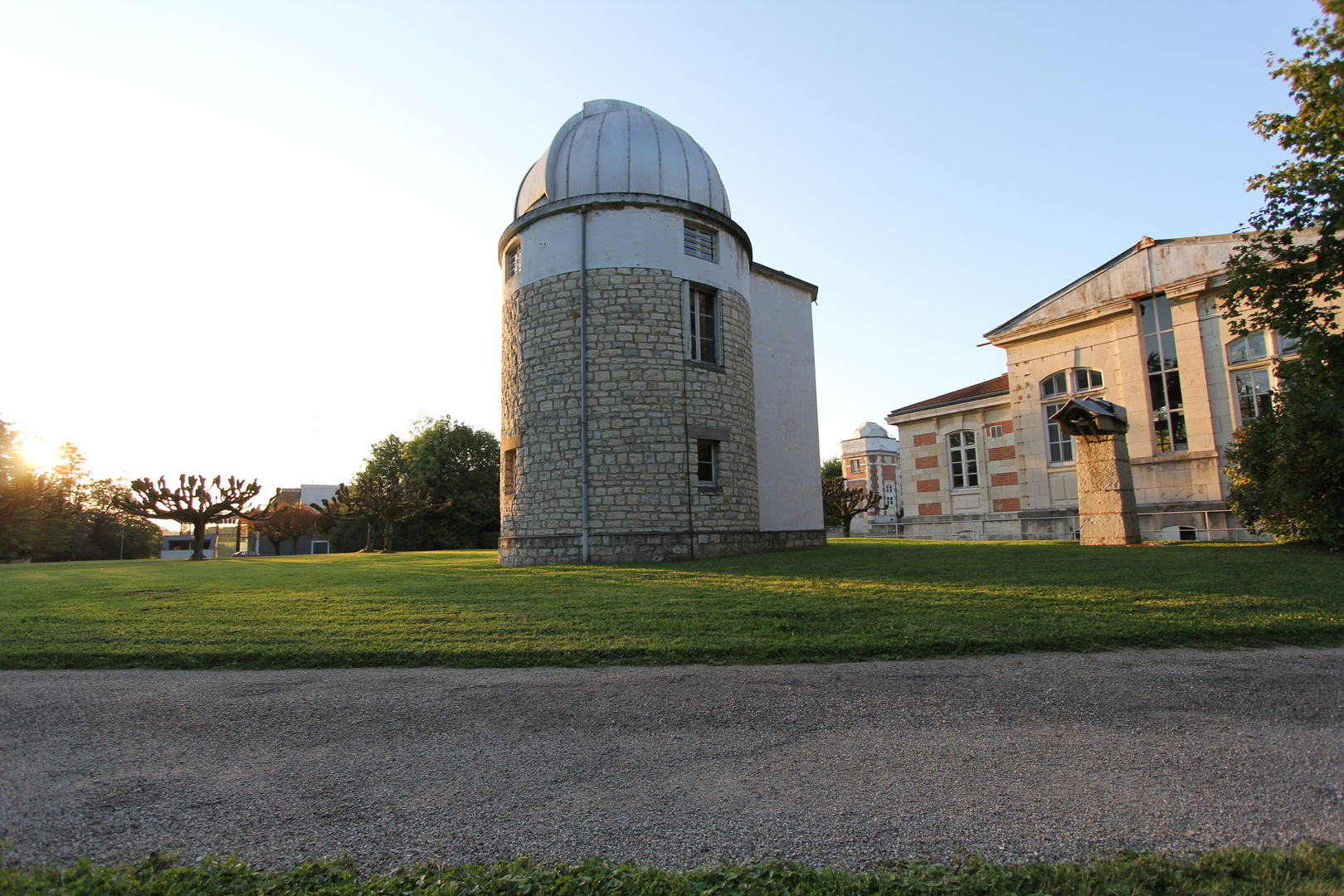
- Alternative names: Besançon Observatory
- Organization: French National Centre for Scientific Research
- Observatory code: 016
- Location: Besançon, France
- Coordinates: 47°14′49″N 5°59′23″E
- Altitude: 360 m (1,180 ft)
- Established: 1884
- Website: www.obs-besancon.fr
- Location of Besançon Astronomical Observatory
- Related media on Commons

The Besançon Astronomical Observatory (French: Observatoire de Besançon ou Observatoire des sciences de l'Univers de Besançon) is an astronomical observatory owned and operated by the Centre national de la recherche scientifique (CNRS, National Center for Scientific Research). It is located in Besançon, France.

In the past, the Besançon Observatory participated in assessing and rating Swiss timepiece movements for accuracy. As marine navigation adopted the usage of mechanical timepieces for navigational aid, the accuracy of such timepieces became more critical. From this need developed an accuracy testing regime involving various astronomical observatories. In Europe, the Neuchatel Observatory, Geneva Observatory, Besançon Observatory and Kew Observatory were examples of prominent observatories that tested timepiece movements for accuracy. The testing process lasted for many days, typically 45 days. Each movement was tested in 5 positions and 2 temperatures, in 10 series of 4 or 5 days each. The tolerances for error were much finer than any other standard, including the ISO 3159 chronometer standard that other testing bodies such as COSC use. Movements that passed the stringent tests were issued a certification from the observatory called a Bulletin de Marche, signed by the Director of the Observatory. The General Bulletin Order stated the testing criteria, and the actual performance of the movement. A movement with a bulletin from an observatory became known as an Observatory Chronometer, and such were issued a chronometer reference number by the Observatory.

The role of the observatories in assessing the accuracy of mechanical timepieces was instrumental in driving the mechanical watchmaking industry toward higher and higher levels of accuracy. As a result, today high quality mechanical watch movements have an extremely high degree of accuracy. However, no mechanical movement could ultimately compare to the accuracy of the quartz movements being developed. Accordingly, such chronometer certification ceased in the late 1960s and early 1970s with the advent of the quartz watch movement.

== See also ==
- List of astronomical observatories
