= COSC =

Institute for testing Swiss watches

Contrôle officiel suisse des Chronomètres

The Contrôle officiel suisse des Chronomètres (COSC), the Official Swiss Chronometer Testing Institute, is the institute responsible for certifying the accuracy and precision of Swiss watches.

== Background ==
Founded in its current form in 1973, the COSC is a Swiss non-profit organization that tests chronometers that are Swiss Made. COSC is an acronym for the organization's French language name, Contrôle Officiel Suisse des Chronomètres.

COSC testing generally applies to watches manufactured or assembled in Switzerland. Notwithstanding, the normative standards are set by international agreement and are the same whether they are nominally labeled ISO or DIN standards. Some German, Japanese, and even non-certified Swiss movements can surpass the normative requirements. The Japanese have largely abandoned the accolade, replacing it with in-house testing to a slightly more strict standard as with, for example, the Grand Seiko. On the other hand, the Germans have set up their own testing facility in Saxony at the Glashütte Observatory where the DIN 8319 standards, which mirror the ISO standards used by COSC, are employed. At one time the French provided similar large scale testing at the Observatory at Besançon, however, today only a very few watches are currently tested there and carry the accolade "Observatory Chronometer".

The organization was founded by five watchmaking cantons of Switzerland: Bern, Geneva, Neuchâtel, Solothurn and Vaud, together with the Federation of the Swiss Watch Industry (FHS). It encompasses the laboratories and observatories that had been created independently of each other from the late 19th century.

Three laboratories now test the movements submitted by individual watch manufacturers to be granted chronometer status. They are in Biel/Bienne, Saint-Imier/BE and Le Locle. The Saint-Imier and Biel laboratories are almost entirely devoted to testing Rolex movements. Although not all Rolex watches are chronometers, Breitling has claimed that since 2000 all of its production is COSC certified. Omega also has much of its production certified. Thus, based upon the movements used by Rolex, Breitling, and Omega, the movement calibers that obtain most of the COSC certificates are the Rolex 3135 (since 1988) (and variants 3155, 3175, 3185, 4130) and 2235, the ETA 2892A2 (and variants) and Valjoux 7750, each of which operates at 28,800 beats per hour. Tag Heuer and Ball watches both have select watches designated as chronometers which are sent to COSC for certification.

== Standards and methods ==
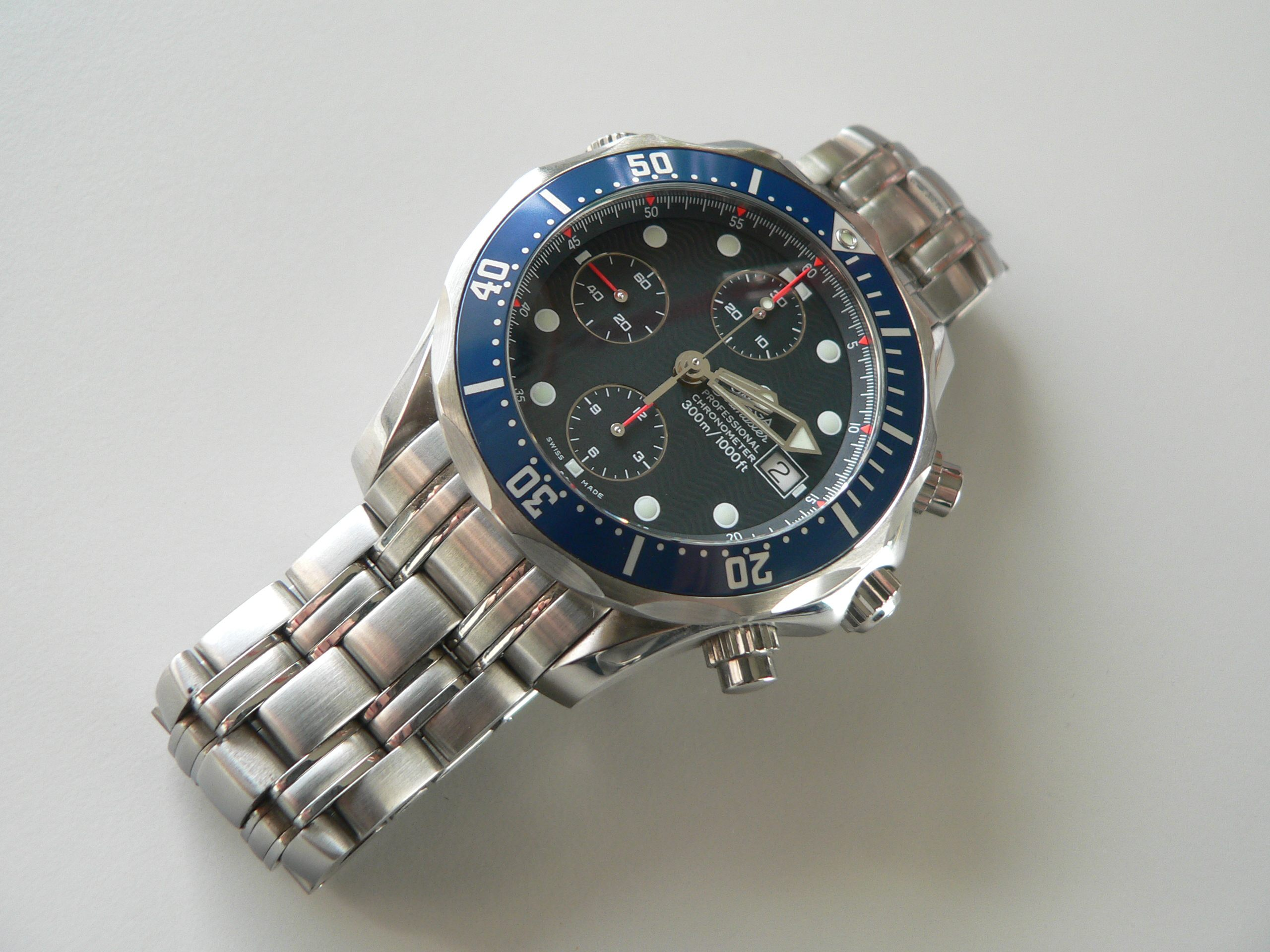
COSC ISO 3159 "Chronometer" certified mechanical watch

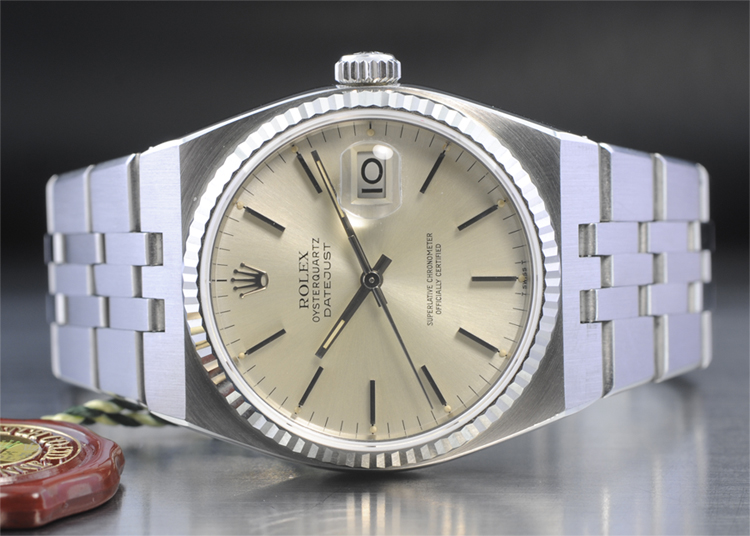
COSC "Chronometer" certified quartz watch

Each officially COSC certified chronometer is identified by a serial number engraved on its movement and a certification number given by the COSC.

Testing criteria are based on ISO 3159 (Timekeeping instruments — Wrist-chronometers with spring balance oscillator) which defines a wrist chronometer with spring-balance oscillator. Only movements which meet the precision criteria established under ISO 3159 are granted an official chronometer certificate. (Compare ISO 3158.) The certificate is valid for the bare movement prior to casing, and only when freshly serviced or assembled. Pre-owned and vintage chronometers generally require a complete service in order to be restored to COSC-levels of performance.

Each uncased movement is individually tested for fifteen days, in five positions, at three different temperatures. The movements are fitted with a seconds hand and the automatic winding mechanisms are disengaged for the tests. Measurements are made daily with the aid of cameras. Based on these measurements, seven eliminatory criteria are calculated, each of which must be met (e.g., for movements of a diameter over 20 mm, the requirements, indicated in seconds/day, are noted in the table below). The testing protocol requires daily winding at precisely the same time each day. There is no ISO standard for quartz timepieces, but there is development in this field. ISO 10553:2018 specifies the procedure for evaluating the accuracy of quartz watches, individually and by lot, and the relationship between the accuracy tested and the accuracy classification given by the manufacturer. It applies to quartz watches having accompanying documents on which the accuracy classification is indicated. Nevertheless, COSC has also developed its own standard for testing quartz chronometers with eight eliminatory criteria, also noted in the table below. To acquire the COSC chronometer label, a quartz instrument must benefit from thermo-compensation and rigorous encapsulation.

COSC standards all units in seconds unless specified
Mechanical	Quartz
Average daily rate: −4/+6	Average daily rate at 23 °C: ±0.07
Mean variation in rates: 2	Rate at 8 °C: ±0.20
Greatest variation in rates: 5	Rate at 38 °C: ±0.20
Difference between rates in H & V positions: −6/+8	Rate stability: 0.05
Largest variation in rates: 10	Dynamic rate: ±0.05
Thermal variation: ±0.60	Temporary effect of mechanical shocks: ±0.05
Rate resumption: ±5	Rate resumption: ±0.05
n/a	Residual effect of mechanical shocks: ±0.05; 200 shocks equivalent to 100 g (981 m/s², 3,217 ft/s²)
n/a	Humidity: ±0.10 (temporary effect)

A COSC certified mechanical chronometer is tested for 15 days and checked with two key pieces of data:

- temperature
- the position of the movement (3 o’clock, 6 o’clock, 9 o’clock, dial on top, dial on the bottom)

A COSC certified quartz chronometer is tested for 13 days, in one position, at 3 different temperatures and 4 different relative humidity levels.

Measurements are compared with a time base established by two independent atomic clocks synchronized on GPS time. Not all chronometers are supplied with the report issued by the COSC as the reports are optional to the brand or maker. Each manufacturer may decide whether to reveal the results gathered during the certification process of the movement. For example, Breitling do supply all their watches with COSC certificates (all Breitling watches since 2000 are certified chronometers) however Rolex and Omega do not supply even their chronometer certified watches (not all their watches are certified chronometers) with the COSC certificates. Omega however can provide the COSC chronometer certificate if asked.

== Observatory trials and standards before 1973 ==
While competitive chronometer testing took place at the observatories in Neuchâtel (1866–1975) and Geneva (1873–1967), testing of large numbers of watches intended for public sale was conducted by the independent Bureaux officiels de contrôle de la marche des montres (B.O.s) established between 1877 and 1956. Between 1961 and 1973, “a chronometer [was] a precision watch, which [was] regulated in several positions and at different temperatures and which had received a certificate [from the (“B.O.)]." Collective certificates, rather than individual certificates, were usually issued. The 1961–73 standard required a mean daily rate in five positions of −1/+10. In 1973, the B.O.’s came under the C.O.S.C. which specified a daily rate of −4/+6 sec.

== The value of COSC certification ==
=== Only fractions of Swiss Watch production are COSC certified ===
Over a million official chronometer certificates are delivered each year. To earn chronometer certification, the movement must be entered for, and pass the test, which must be paid for.

Of Swiss made mechanical watches, approximately 5% are chronometer certified by the COSC and of the Swiss made quartz watches, approximately 0.2% are chronometer certified by the COSC.

=== Meaningful test or marketing gimmick? ===
There is a debate among watch enthusiasts as to whether the COSC chronometer certification for a Swiss watch is a meaningful test or a simple marketing gimmick. On the one hand, when a watch maker intends to submit a movement for COSC testing, they frequently employ additional jewelling (i.e. to the barrel) and better quality "Ébauche" parts (i.e. higher quality hairsprings, mainsprings, balance wheels; regulators, etc.) all aimed at the coveted chronometer certification. COSC certified movements have a higher quality than other watches. On the other hand, it is likely that most good quality movements on the market today are capable of being tweaked, and timed to fall comfortably within the benchmark -4/+6 average daily rate criteria of the COSC.

Therefore, some of the ″Haute Horlogerie″ Swiss Watch Manufacturers have created on 5 June 2001, ″The Fleurier Quality Foundation″ (permanently closed) to establish new aesthetic and technical criteria dedicated to the certification of finished watches. Their certification meets a normative requirement for the market and the final customer to have a better definition of quality watchmaking, adapted to today's demands and technological advances. Geneva's have created along similar criteria the Geneva seal.

==== Exemplar brands submitting to COSC ====
Rolex by far submits the largest number of movements to COSC, over a million a year, followed by Omega, Tudor, Breitling, Mido and Tissot. Rolex and Breitling submit all movements for certification, but other manufacturers only submit certain models.

=== Certification in perspective ===
Certification verifies the accuracy and quality of a mechanical movement. However, the fine regulation and chronometer characteristics of a watch can be destroyed in seconds by a rough and inexperienced hand.

== Additional METAS Master Chronometer certification ==
=== METAS N001 "Master Chronometer" certification ===
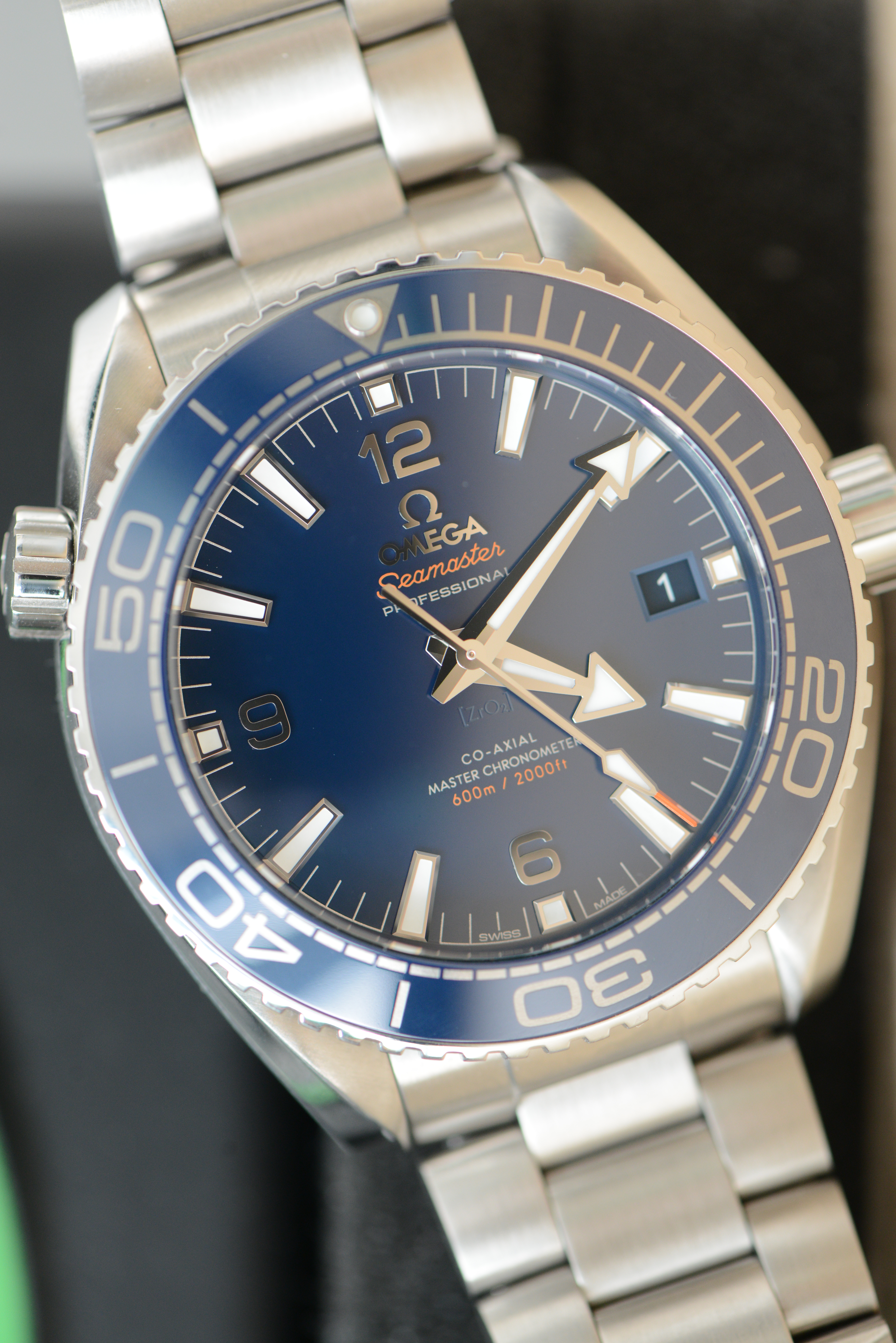
Double certified mechanical watch: COSC ISO 3159 "Chronometer" and METAS N001 "Master Chronometer"

The Swiss Federal Institute of Metrology (METAS) has developed new stricter standard METAS N001 requirements for movements and mechanical watches resistant to magnetic fields of 1.5 T (15,000 G). Mechanical watches are put to the test during 10 test cycles which will consider in particular the resistance to magnetic fields, the precision of the rate (watch drift over 24 hours) and the water resistance of the watch. Unlike the ISO 3159 Timekeeping instruments — Wrist-chronometers with spring balance oscillator standard, it is no longer just the uncased movements that are tested, but completely assembled watches.

=== Part A - Technical requirements ===
The first condition is that the watch must be "Swiss Made" and meet the requirements set by the ordinance regulating the use of the name "Switzerland" for watches (RS 232.119), in its latest version in force. In addition, the movement must already be certified as a "Chronometer" and must therefore follow, in a laboratory, the tests defined in the ISO 3159 standard. Finally, the movement and the watch must be subjected to 10 test cycles and satisfy to the 8 technical criteria of the METAS Requirements. The 10 test cycles are operations to be performed on each movement and each watch and make it possible to obtain the values necessary for the calculation of the 8 criteria. Among these, two are particularly demanding for the watch manufacturer, and therefore interesting for the end customer. It is first the average daily precision in 6 positions and 2 temperatures, over 4 days (4 × 24 hours). A user is simulated who wears the watch on their wrist in different positions of their arm; the 2 temperatures represent the temperature when the watch is worn by the user (approx. 33 °C) and when the watch is removed (approx. 23 °C). According to the acceptance criteria of the requirements, the watch must remain within the tolerances [between 0/≤5 seconds]. That is, the watch should not delay at all, and the upper limit is 5 seconds fast in 24 hours. The criterion of resistance to magnetic fields is innovative. Until now, the ISO 764 Horology — Magnetic resistant watches standard defines that an antimagnetic watch must support a magnetic field of 4,800 A/m, which corresponds to 60 gauss. METAS certification subjects watches and movements to 15,000 gauss (1.5 tesla).

=== Part B - Organizational requirements ===
Checks are carried out on 100% of the watches by an independent testing laboratory or by the manufacturer. For METAS to ensure that these measurements are always correct, a plan to monitor the testing process has been put in place. The organizational requirements are as follows:

- A statistical analysis of the results of the measurements of the test laboratory
- A control by sampling carried out in a METAS laboratory
- Periodic audits of the test laboratory by METAS-Cert

A laboratory of METAS was created to carry out checks on the watches to be certified. A sampling of the watches will be checked by METAS. METAS results and those of the test laboratory are then compared. When all the requirements of parts A and B have been fulfilled, a watch is entitled to bear the designation "Master Chronometer".

=== METAS infrastructure ===
The main devices are used to measure instantaneous rate (Witschi M10 Chronoscope) and daily precision (Qualima-test). These two measurements are used to indicate how much the watch is advancing or losing compared to a reference clock. Instant running achieves this over short periods of time (30 seconds) while the daily precision is taken between 23 and 26 hours. The highlights of this certification are in particular the test of the resistance of the watch in relation to magnetic fields and the tight limits for the average daily precision. This being the case, the totality of the checks (magnetism, operation, and water resistance) guarantees a very high-quality mechanical watch for the end customer.

Mechanical watches can be first COSC ISO 3159 "Chronometer" certified and after that METAS N001 "Master Chronometer" certified when all the relevant requirements are met. The first mechanical watches that met the METAS Certified Master Chronometer requirements featured Omega 8900 series automatic movements.

== See also ==
- British Horological Institute
- Geneva seal
- Science and technology in Switzerland
