= Pendulum clock =

Clock regulated by a pendulum

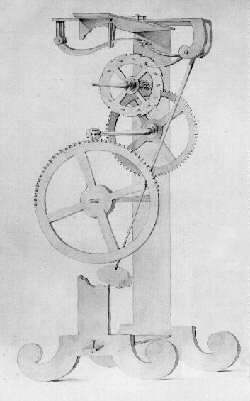
A design for a pendulum clock by Vincenzo Viviani in c. 1637. The clock was never completed.

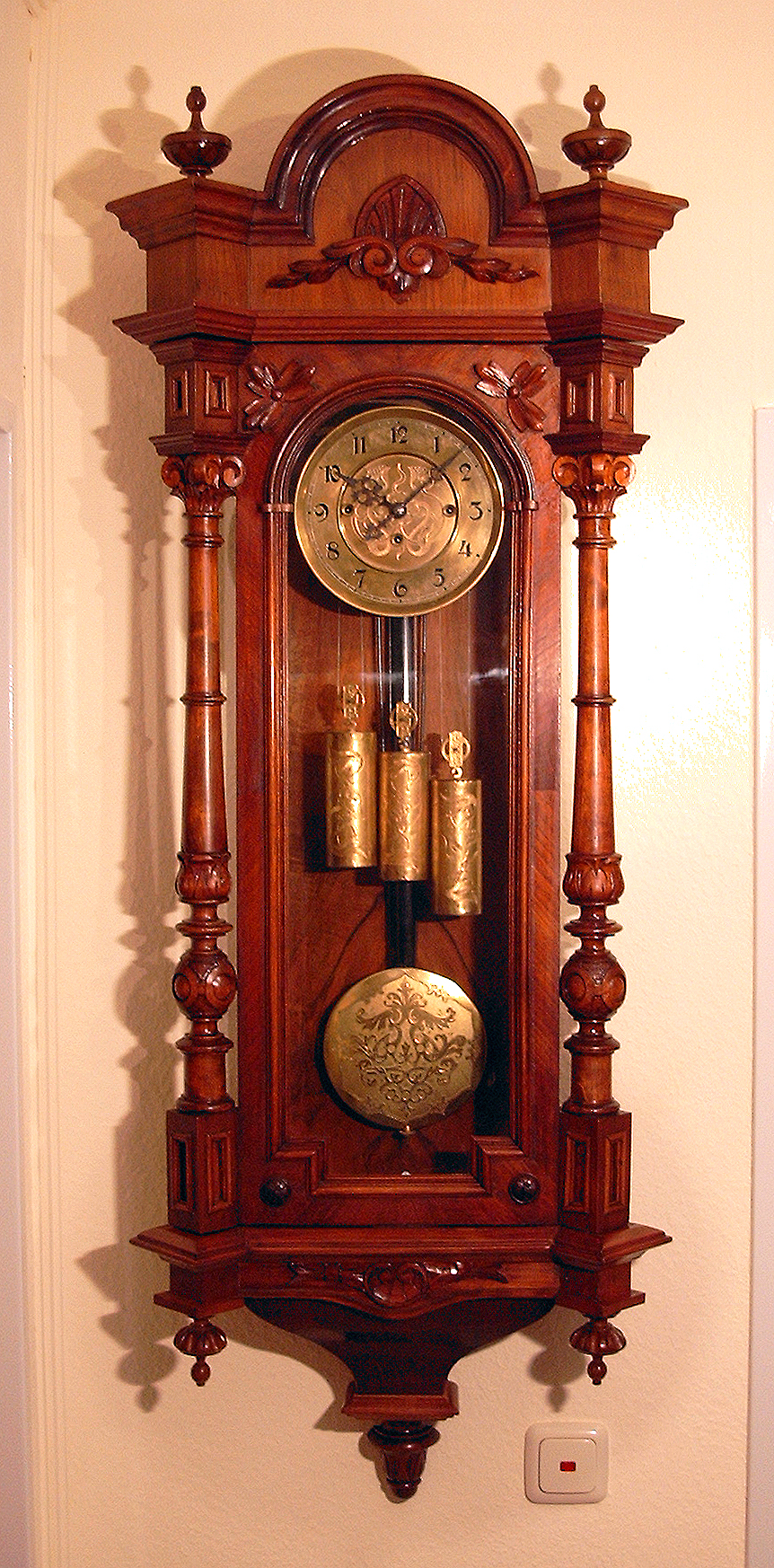
A German 19th century wallclock made by Gustav Becker

Portrait of Christaan Huygens the creator of the pendulum clock. Portrait made in 1671 by Caspar Netscher.

A pendulum clock is a clock that uses a swinging weight known as a pendulum as its timekeeping element. The pendulum is an approximate harmonic oscillator that swings in a time interval that depends on its length, and that resists swinging at other rates. From its invention in 1656 by Christiaan Huygens, inspired by Galileo Galilei, until the 1930s, the pendulum clock was the world's most precise type of timekeeper. Throughout the 18th and 19th centuries, pendulum clocks in homes, factories, offices, and railroad stations served as primary time standards for scheduling daily life activities, work shifts, and public transportation. Their accuracy allowed for the fast pace of life during the Industrial Revolution. The home pendulum clock, which was replaced by cheaper synchronous electric clocks in the 1930s and 1940s, are now kept mostly for their decorative and antique value.

As pendulum clocks must be stationary in order to avoid affecting the motion of the pendulum, other mechanisms are used in portable timepieces.

== History ==
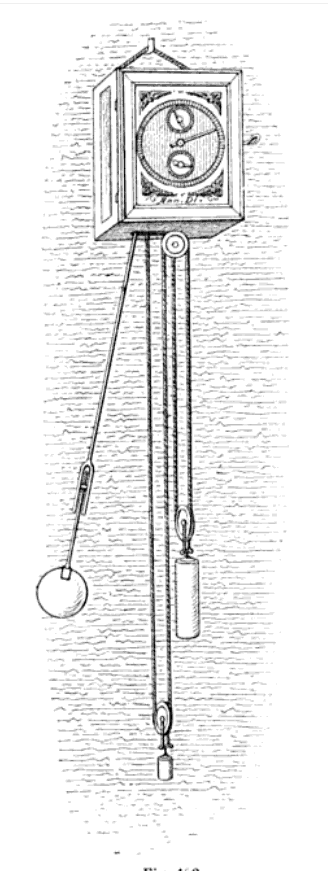
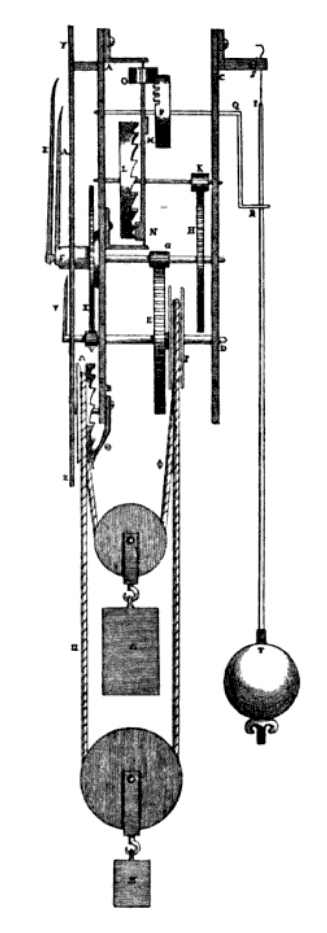
The first pendulum clock, invented by Christiaan Huygens in 1656

The pendulum clock was invented on 25 December 1656 by Dutch scientist and inventor Christiaan Huygens. The invention was patented the following year. Huygens described it in his manuscript Horologium (1658). Huygens contracted the construction of his clock to Salomon Coster.

Huygens was inspired by investigations of pendulums by Galileo Galilei in around 1602, who had discovered the key property that makes pendulums useful timekeepers—they behave isochronically, so that they swing with a period that is independent of the size of the swing. In 1637, Galileo described a mechanism to his son, Vincenzo that could keep a pendulum swinging. The mechanism was partly constructed by his son in 1649.

Prior to the discovery of the pendulum many clock makers during the 1580s were given commission to create clocks showing minutes and second on them, this was not possible though since clocks mechanisms at the time were not accurate enough to add these markers. Before the use of pendulums in clocks, they were accurate to about 15 minutes per day. The introduction of the pendulum, the first harmonic oscillator used in timekeeping, increased their accuracy to 15 seconds per day, an improvement that led to their rapid spread. Many existing "verge and foliot" clocks were fitted with pendulums. By 1659 pendulum clocks were being manufactured by the French clockmaker Nicolaus Hanet, and in England by Ahasuerus Fromanteel.

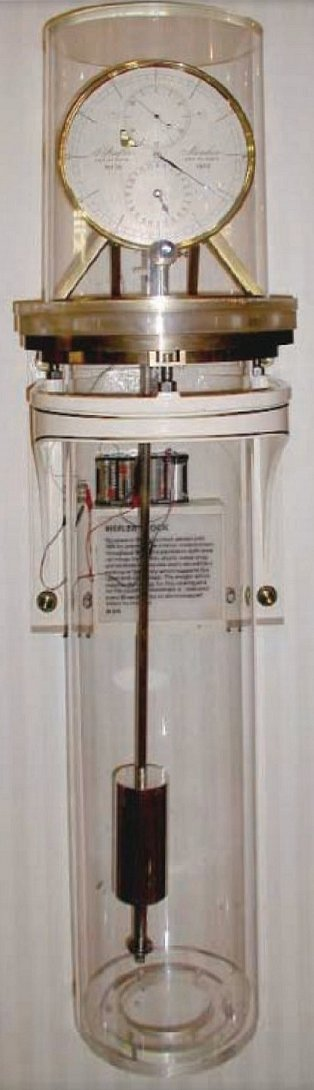
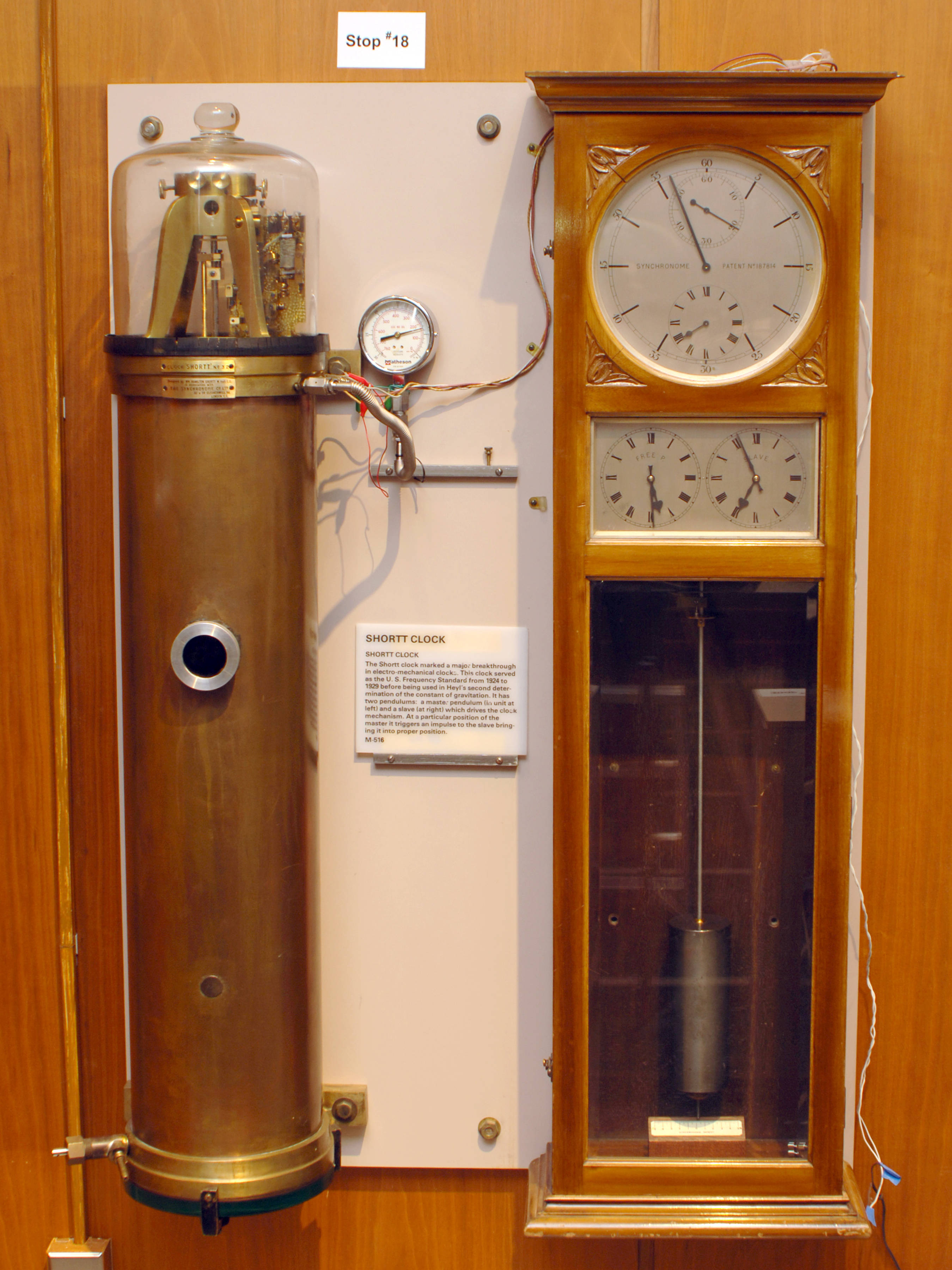
Some of the most accurate pendulum clocks: (left) Riefler regulator clock, that served as the US time standard from 1909 to 1929, (right) Shortt-Synchronome clock, the most accurate pendulum clock ever manufactured at the time of its creation in the 1920s. It served as the time standard throughout the 30s.

These early clocks, due to their verge escapements, had wide pendulum swings of 80–100°. In his 1673 analysis of pendulums, Horologium Oscillatorium, Huygens showed that wide swings made the pendulum inaccurate, causing its period, and thus the rate of the clock, to vary with unavoidable variations in the driving force provided by the movement. In this Huygens concluded that it was best to create a clock with a cycloid shape rather than a circular shape, so the clock would oscillate in the same time regardless of amplitude. Clockmakers' realization that only pendulums with small swings of a few degrees are isochronous motivated the invention of the anchor escapement by Robert Hooke around 1658, which reduced the pendulum's swing to 4–6°. The anchor became the standard escapement used in pendulum clocks. In addition to increased accuracy, the anchor's narrow pendulum swing allowed the clock's case to accommodate longer, slower pendulums, which needed less power and caused less wear on the movement.The seconds pendulum (also called the Royal pendulum), 0.994 m (39.1 in) long, in which the time period is two seconds, became widely used in quality clocks. Huygens took this the creation of the pendulum clock a step further and in 1675 added the spiral balance spring. Similar to how gravity controls a pendulum clock the balance spring would control the rotary oscillation of a balance wheel in a portable clock. This discovery of using a similar motion in a pendulum clock in a portal clocks revolutionized the industry forever. The long narrow freestanding clocks built around these pendulums, first made by William Clement around 1680, who also claimed invention of the anchor escapement, became known as grandfather clocks. The increased accuracy resulting from these developments caused the minute hand, previously rare, to be added to clock faces beginning around 1690.

The 18th and 19th century wave of horological innovation that followed the invention of the pendulum brought many improvements to pendulum clocks. The deadbeat escapement invented in 1675 by Richard Towneley and popularized by George Graham around 1715 in his precision "regulator" clocks gradually replaced the anchor escapement and is now used in most modern pendulum clocks. Observation that pendulum clocks slowed down in summer brought the realization that thermal expansion and contraction of the pendulum rod with changes in temperature was a source of error. This was solved by the invention of temperature-compensated pendulums; the mercury pendulum by Graham in 1721 and the gridiron pendulum by John Harrison in 1726. With these improvements, by the mid-18th century precision pendulum clocks achieved accuracies of a few seconds per week.

Until the 19th century, clocks were handmade by individual craftsmen and were very expensive. The rich ornamentation of pendulum clocks of this period indicates their value as status symbols of the wealthy. The clockmakers of each country and region in Europe developed their own distinctive styles. By the 19th century, factory production of clock parts gradually made pendulum clocks affordable by middle-class families.

During the Industrial Revolution, the faster pace of life and scheduling of shifts and public transportation like trains depended on the more accurate timekeeping made possible by the pendulum. Daily life was organized around the home pendulum clock. More accurate pendulum clocks, called regulators, were installed in places of business and railroad stations and used to schedule work and set other clocks. The need for extremely accurate timekeeping in celestial navigation to determine longitude on ships during long sea voyages drove the development of the most accurate pendulum clocks, called astronomical regulators. These precision instruments, installed in clock vaults in naval observatories and kept accurate within a fraction of a second by observation of star transits overhead, were used to set marine chronometers on naval and commercial vessels. Beginning in the 19th century, astronomical regulators in naval observatories served as primary standards for national time distribution services that distributed time signals over telegraph wires. From 1909, US National Bureau of Standards (now NIST) based the US time standard on Riefler pendulum clocks, accurate to about 10 milliseconds per day. In 1929 it switched to the Shortt-Synchronome free pendulum clock before phasing in quartz standards in the 1930s. With an error of less than one second per year, the Shortt was the most accurate commercially produced pendulum clock at the time of its creation.

Pendulum clocks remained the world standard for accurate timekeeping for 270 years, until the invention of the quartz clock in 1927, and were used as time standards through World War II. The French Time Service included pendulum clocks in their ensemble of standard clocks until 1954. The home pendulum clock began to be replaced as domestic timekeeper during the 1930s and 1940s by the synchronous electric clock, which kept more accurate time because it was synchronized to the oscillation of the electric power grid. Behind the Iron Curtain, where quartz technology was unavailable, experiments with pendulum clocks continued for much longer, with corresponding developments in accuracy: the AChF-3 isochronous pendulum clock developed by physicist Feodosii Fedchenko in 1955 has an accuracy in the range of quartz clocks and is the most accurate pendulum clock ever to have gone into production. The most accurate experimental pendulum clock ever made may be the Littlemore Clock built by Edward T. Hall in the 1990s (donated in 2003 to the National Watch and Clock Museum, Columbia, Pennsylvania, USA). The largest pendulum clocks, exceeding 30 m (98 ft), were built in Geneva (1972) and Gdańsk (2016).

== Mechanism ==
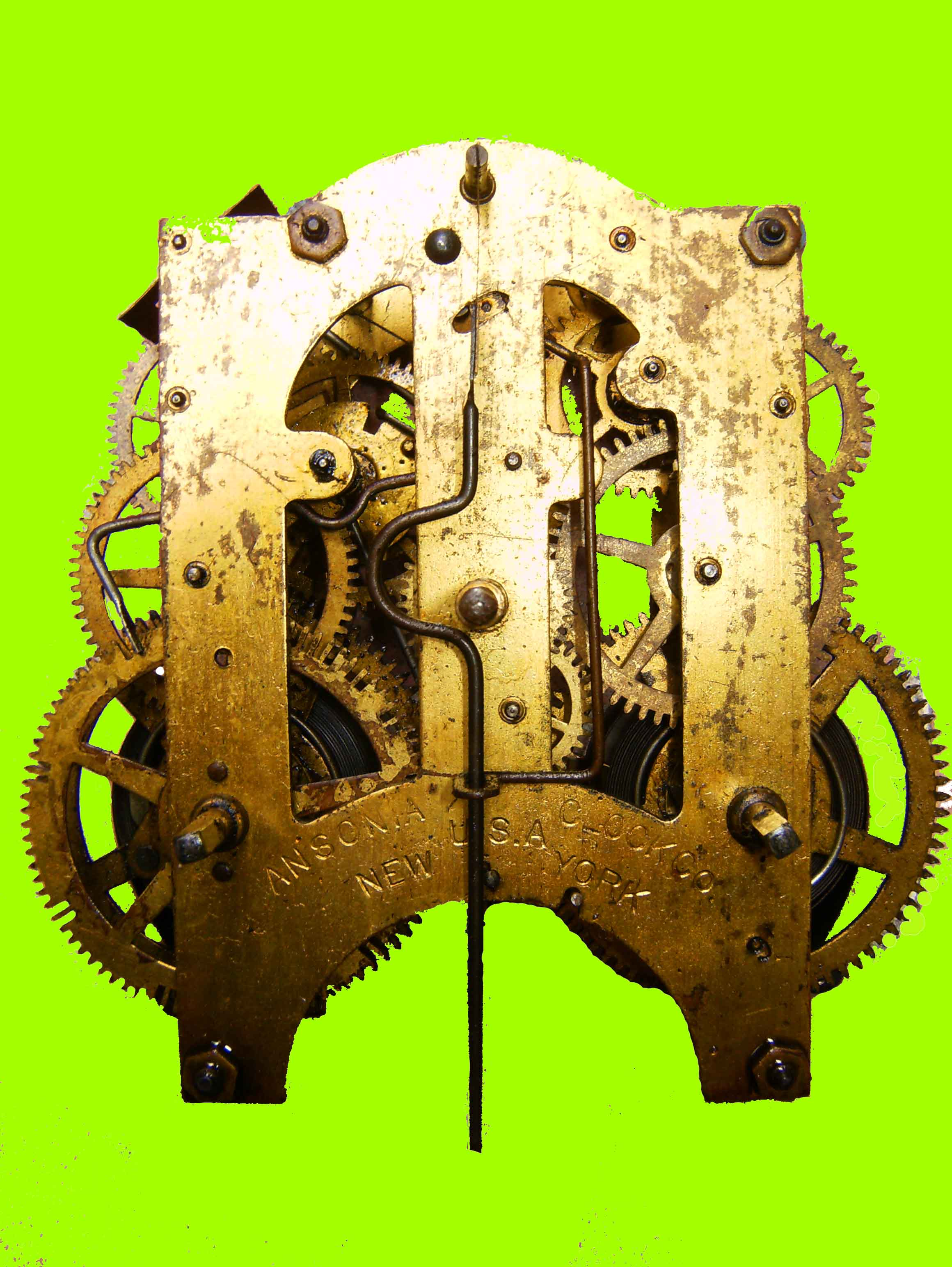
Ansonia Clock model mechanism, c. 1904

The mechanism which runs a mechanical clock is called the movement. The movements of all mechanical pendulum clocks have these five parts:

- A power source; either a weight on a cord or chain that turns a pulley or sprocket, or a mainspring.
- A gear train (wheel train) that steps up the speed of the power so that the pendulum can use it. The gear ratios of the gear train also divide the rotation rate down to give wheels that rotate once every hour and once every 12 or 24 hours, to turn the hands of the clock.
- An escapement that gives the pendulum precisely timed impulses to keep it swinging, and which releases the gear train wheels to move forward a fixed amount at each swing. This is the source of the "ticking" sound of an operating pendulum clock.
- The pendulum, a weight on a rod, which is the timekeeping element of the clock.
- An indicator or dial that records how often the escapement has rotated and therefore how much time has passed, usually a traditional clock face with rotating hands.

Additional functions in clocks besides basic timekeeping are called complications. More elaborate pendulum clocks may include these complications:

- Striking train: strikes a bell or gong on every hour, with the number of strikes equal to the number of the hour. Some clocks will also signal the half hour with a single strike. More elaborate types, technically called chiming clocks, strike on the quarter hours, and may play melodies or Cathedral chimes, usually Westminster quarters.
- Calendar dials: show the day, date, and sometimes month.
- Moon phase dial: shows the phase of the moon, usually with a painted picture of the moon on a rotating disk. These were useful historically for people planning nighttime journeys.
- Equation of time dial: this rare complication was used in early days to set the clock by the passage of the sun overhead at noon. It displays the difference between the time indicated by the clock and the time indicated by the position of the sun, which varies by as much as ±16 minutes during the year.
- Repeater attachment: repeats the hour chimes when triggered by hand. This rare complication was used before artificial lighting to check what time it was at night.

In electromechanical pendulum clocks such as used in mechanical Master clocks the power source is replaced by an electrically powered solenoid that provides the impulses to the pendulum by magnetic force, and the escapement is replaced by a switch or photodetector that senses when the pendulum is in the right position to receive the impulse. These should not be confused with more recent quartz pendulum clocks in which an electronic quartz clock module swings a pendulum. These are not true pendulum clocks because the timekeeping is controlled by a quartz crystal in the module, and the swinging pendulum is merely a decorative simulation.

== Gravity-swing pendulum ==
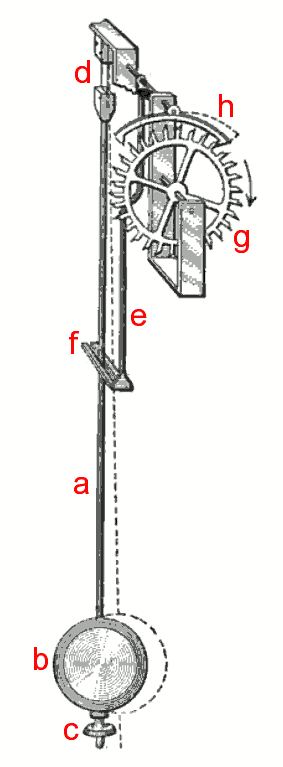
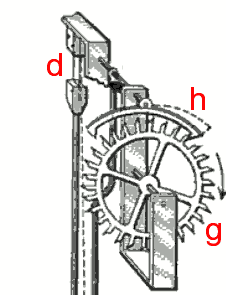
Structure of a pendulum mechanism: (a) rod; (b) bob; (c) adjustment nut; (d) spring of metal ribbon; (e) crutch; (f) fork; (h) the escapement.

The pendulums in most clocks have a metal weight or bob connected to a wood or metal rod. The bob is traditionally lens-shaped to reduce drag. Wooden rods were often used in quality clocks because wood had a lower coefficient of thermal expansion than metal. The rod is usually suspended from the clock frame with a short straight spring of metal ribbon; this avoids instabilities that were introduced by a conventional pivot. In the most accurate regulator clocks the pendulum is suspended by metal knife edges resting on flat agate (a hard mineral that will retain a highly polished surface).

The pendulum is driven by an arm hanging behind it attached to the anchor piece of the escapement, called the "crutch", ending in a "fork" which embraces the pendulum rod. Each swing of the pendulum releases the escape wheel, and a tooth of the wheel presses against one of the pallets, exerting a brief push through the crutch and fork on the pendulum rod to keep it swinging.

Most quality clocks, including all grandfather clocks, have a "seconds pendulum", in which each swing of the pendulum takes one second (a complete cycle takes two seconds), which is approximately one metre (39 inches) long from pivot to center of bob. Mantel clocks often have a half-second pendulum, which is approximately 25 centimetres (9.8 in) long. Only a few tower clocks use longer pendulums, the 1.5 second pendulum, 2.25 m (7.4 ft) long, or occasionally the two-second pendulum, 4 m (13 ft) which is used in the Great Clock of Westminster which houses Big Ben.

The pendulum swings with a period that varies with the square root of its effective length. For small swings the period T, the time for one complete cycle (two swings), is

$$T = 2 \pi \sqrt{\frac{L}{g}} \,$$

where L is the length of the pendulum and g is the local acceleration of gravity. All pendulum clocks have a means of adjusting the rate. This is usually an adjustment nut (c) under the pendulum bob which moves the bob up or down on its rod. Moving the bob up reduces the length of the pendulum, reducing the pendulum's period so the clock gains time. In some pendulum clocks, fine adjustment is done with an auxiliary adjustment, which may be a small weight that is moved up or down the pendulum rod. In some master clocks and tower clocks, adjustment is accomplished by a small tray mounted on the rod where small weights are placed or removed to change the effective length, so the rate can be adjusted without stopping the clock.

The period of a pendulum increases slightly with the width (amplitude) of its swing; this is called circular error. The rate of error increases with amplitude, so when limited to small swings of a few degrees the pendulum is nearly isochronous; its period is independent of changes in amplitude. Therefore, the swing of the pendulum in clocks is limited to 2° to 4°.

Small swing angles tend toward isochronous behavior due to the mathematical fact that the approximation $\sin (x) = x$ becomes valid as the angle approaches zero. With that substitution made, the pendulum equation becomes the equation of a harmonic oscillator, which has a fixed period in all cases. As the swing angle becomes larger, the approximation gradually fails and the period is no longer fixed.

=== Temperature compensation ===
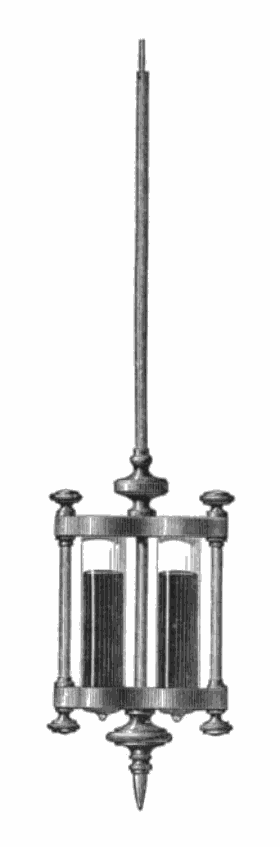
Mercury pendulum

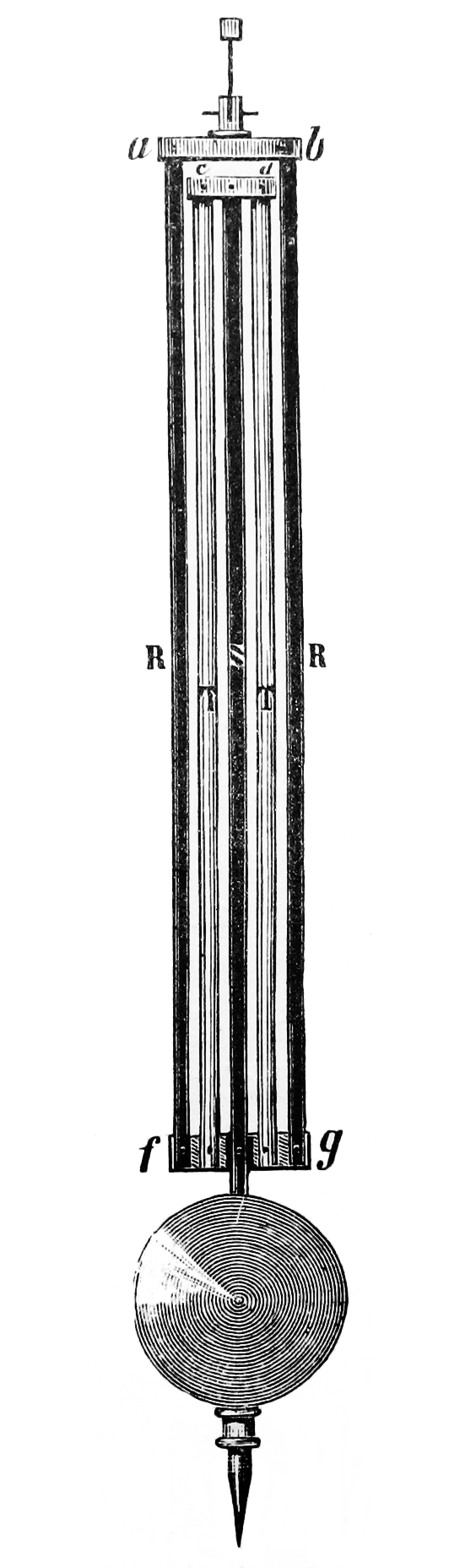
Gridiron pendulum

A major source of error in pendulum clocks is thermal expansion; the pendulum rod changes in length slightly with changes in temperature, causing changes in the rate of the clock. An increase in temperature causes the rod to expand, making the pendulum longer, so its period increases and the clock loses time. Many older quality clocks used wooden pendulum rods to reduce this error, as wood expands less than metal.

The first pendulum to correct for this error was the mercury pendulum invented by Graham in 1721, which was used in precision regulator clocks into the 20th century. These had a bob consisting of a container of the liquid metal mercury. An increase in temperature would cause the pendulum rod to expand, but the mercury in the container would also expand and its level would rise slightly in the container, moving the center of gravity of the pendulum up toward the pivot. By using the correct amount of mercury, the centre of gravity of the pendulum remained at a constant height, and thus its period remained constant, despite changes in temperature.

The most widely used temperature-compensated pendulum was the gridiron pendulum invented by John Harrison around 1726. This consisted of a "grid" of parallel rods of high-thermal-expansion metal such as zinc or brass and low-thermal-expansion metal such as steel. If properly combined, the length change of the high-expansion rods compensated for the length change of the low-expansion rods, again achieving a constant period of the pendulum with temperature changes. This type of pendulum became so associated with quality that decorative "fake" gridirons are often seen on pendulum clocks, that have no actual temperature compensation function.

Beginning around 1900, some of the highest precision scientific clocks had pendulums made of ultra-low-expansion materials such as the nickel steel alloy Invar or fused silica, which required very little compensation for the effects of temperature.

=== Atmospheric drag ===
The viscosity of the air through which the pendulum swings will vary with atmospheric pressure, humidity, and temperature. This drag also requires power that could otherwise be applied to extending the time between windings. Traditionally the pendulum bob is made with a narrow streamlined lens shape to reduce air drag, which is where most of the driving power goes in a quality clock. In the late 19th century and early 20th century, pendulums for precision regulator clocks in astronomical observatories were often operated in a chamber that had been pumped to a low pressure to reduce drag and make the pendulum's operation even more accurate by avoiding changes in atmospheric pressure. Fine adjustment of the rate of the clock could be made by slight changes to the internal pressure in the sealed housing.

=== Leveling and "beat" ===
To keep time accurately, pendulum clocks must be level. If they are not, the pendulum swings more to one side than the other, upsetting the symmetrical operation of the escapement. This condition can often be heard audibly in the ticking sound of the clock. The ticks or "beats" should be at precisely equally spaced intervals to give a sound of, "tick...tock...tick...tock"; if they are not, and have the sound "tick-tock...tick-tock..." the clock is out of beat and needs to be leveled. This problem can easily cause the clock to stop working, and is one of the most common reasons for service calls. A spirit level or watch timing machine can achieve a higher accuracy than relying on the sound of the beat; precision regulators often have a built-in spirit level for the task. Older freestanding clocks often have feet with adjustable screws to level them, more recent ones have a leveling adjustment in the movement. Some modern pendulum clocks have 'auto-beat' or 'self-regulating beat adjustment' devices, and do not need this adjustment.

=== Local gravity ===
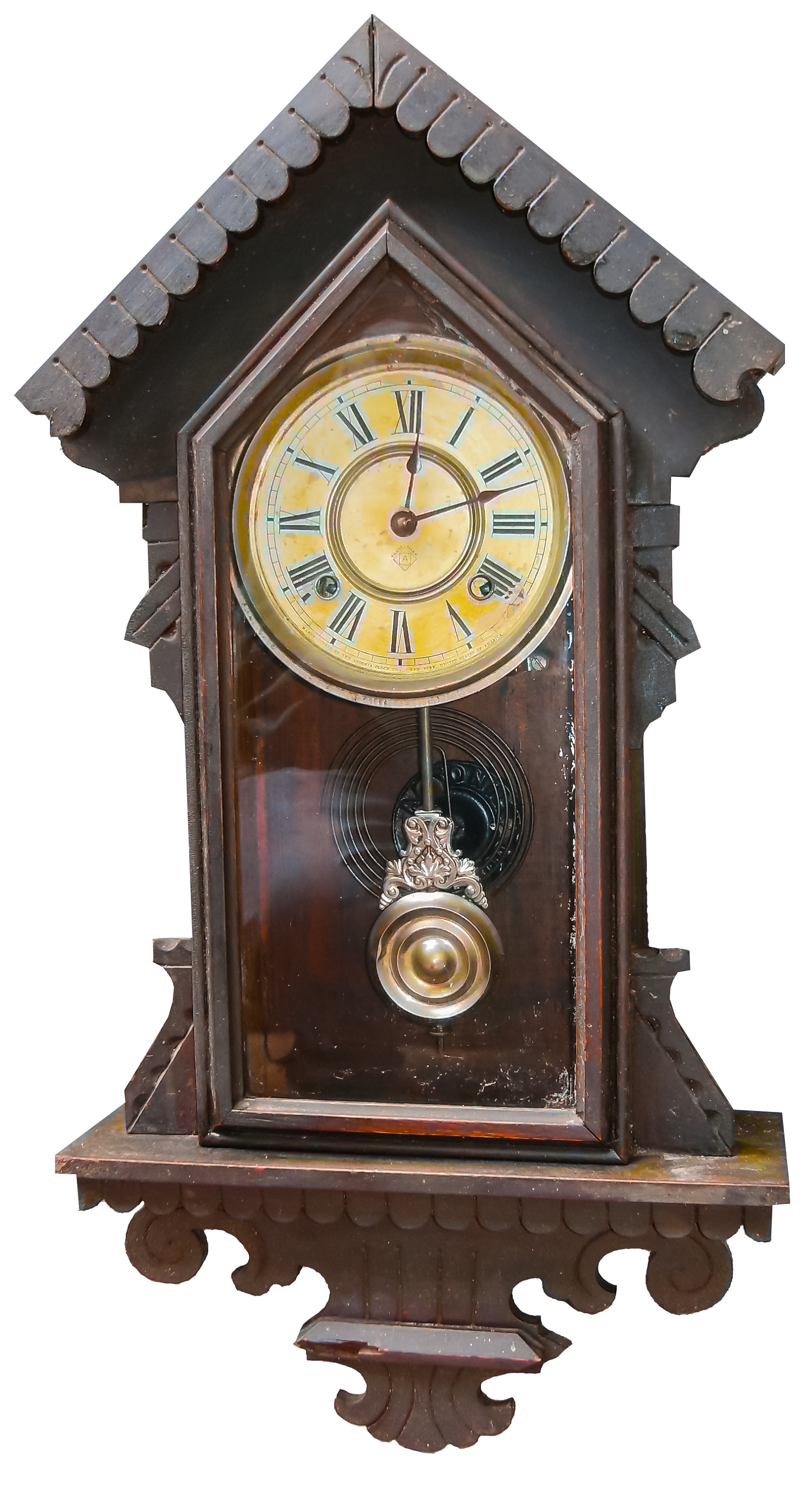
Pendulum clock Ansonia. C. 1904, SANTIAGO, hanging oak gingerbread clock, eight-day time and strike.

Since the pendulum rate will increase with an increase in gravity, and local gravitational acceleration $g$ varies with latitude and elevation on Earth, the highest precision pendulum clocks must be readjusted to keep time after a move. For example, a pendulum clock moved from sea level to 4,000 feet (1,200 m) will lose 16 seconds per day. With the most accurate pendulum clocks, even moving the clock to the top of a tall building would cause it to lose measurable time due to lower gravity. The local gravity also varies by about 0.5% with latitude between the equator and the poles, with gravity increasing at higher latitudes due to the oblate shape of the Earth. Thus precision regulator clocks used for celestial navigation in the early 20th century had to be recalibrated when moved to a different latitude.

== Torsion pendulum ==
Also called torsion-spring pendulum, this is a wheel-like mass (most often four spheres on cross spokes) suspended from a vertical strip (ribbon) of spring steel, used as the regulating mechanism in torsion pendulum clocks. Rotation of the mass winds and unwinds the suspension spring, with the energy impulse applied to the top of the spring. The main advantage of this type of pendulum is its low energy use; with a period of 12–15 seconds, compared to the gravity swing pendulum's period of 0.5—2s, it is possible to make clocks that need to be wound only every 30 days, or even only once a year or more. Since the restoring force is provided by the elasticity of the spring, which varies with temperature, it is more affected by temperature changes than a gravity-swing pendulum. The most accurate torsion clocks use a spring of elinvar which has low temperature coefficient of elasticity.

A torsion pendulum clock requiring only annual winding is sometimes called a "400-Day clock" or "anniversary clock", sometimes given as a wedding gift. Torsion pendulums are also used in "perpetual" clocks which do not need winding, as their mainspring is kept wound by changes in atmospheric temperature and pressure with a bellows arrangement. The Atmos clock, one example, uses a torsion pendulum with a long oscillation period of 60 seconds.

== Escapement ==
Animation of an anchor escapement, one of the most common escapements used in pendulum clocks

The escapement is a mechanical linkage that converts the force from the clock's wheel train into impulses that keep the pendulum swinging back and forth. It is the part that makes the "ticking" sound in a working pendulum clock. Most escapements consist of a wheel with pointed teeth called the escape wheel which is turned by the clock's wheel train, and surfaces the teeth push against, called pallets. During most of the pendulum's swing the wheel is prevented from turning because a tooth is resting against one of the pallets; this is called the "locked" state. Each swing of the pendulum a pallet releases a tooth of the escape wheel. The wheel rotates forward a fixed amount until a tooth catches on the other pallet. These releases allow the clock's wheel train to advance a fixed amount with each swing, moving the hands forward at a constant rate, controlled by the pendulum.

Although the escapement is necessary, its force disturbs the natural motion of the pendulum, and in precision pendulum clocks this was often the limiting factor on the accuracy of the clock. Different escapements have been used in pendulum clocks over the years to try to solve this problem. In the 18th and 19th centuries, escapement design was at the forefront of timekeeping advances. The anchor escapement (see animation) was the standard escapement used until the 1800s when an improved version, the deadbeat escapement, took over in precision clocks. It is used in almost all pendulum clocks today. The remontoire, a small spring mechanism rewound at intervals which serves to isolate the escapement from the varying force of the wheel train, was used in a few precision clocks. In tower clocks the wheel train must turn the large hands on the clock face on the outside of the building, and the weight of these hands, varying with snow and ice buildup, put a varying load on the wheel train. Gravity escapements were used in tower clocks.

By the end of the 19th century specialized escapements were used in the most accurate clocks, called astronomical regulators, which were employed in naval observatories and for scientific research. The Riefler escapement, used in Clemens-Riefler regulator clocks was accurate to 10 milliseconds per day. Electromagnetic escapements, which used a switch or phototube to turn on a solenoid electromagnet to give the pendulum an impulse without requiring a mechanical linkage, were developed. The most accurate pendulum clock was the Shortt-Synchronome clock, a complicated electromechanical clock with two pendulums developed in 1923 by W.H. Shortt and Frank Hope-Jones, which was accurate to better than one second per year. A slave pendulum in a separate clock was linked by an electric circuit and electromagnets to a master pendulum in a vacuum tank. The slave pendulum performed the timekeeping functions, leaving the master pendulum to swing virtually undisturbed by outside influences. In the 1920s the Shortt-Synchronome briefly became the highest standard for timekeeping in observatories before quartz clocks superseded pendulum clocks as precision time standards.

== Time indication ==
The indicating system is almost always the traditional dial with moving hour and minute hands. Many clocks have a small third hand indicating seconds on a subsidiary dial. Pendulum clocks are usually designed to be set by opening the glass face cover and manually pushing the minute hand around the dial to the correct time. The minute hand is mounted on a slipping friction sleeve which allows it to be turned on its arbor. The hour hand is driven not from the wheel train but from the minute hand's shaft through a small set of gears, so rotating the minute hand manually also sets the hour hand.

== Maintenance and Repair ==
Pendulum clocks are long lived and don't require a lot of maintenance, which is one reason for their popularity.

As in any mechanism with moving parts, regular cleaning and lubrication is required. Specific low viscosity lubricants have been developed for clocks, one of the most widely used being a polyalcanoate synthetic oil.

Springs and pins may wear out or break over time and will need to be replaced.

== Styles ==
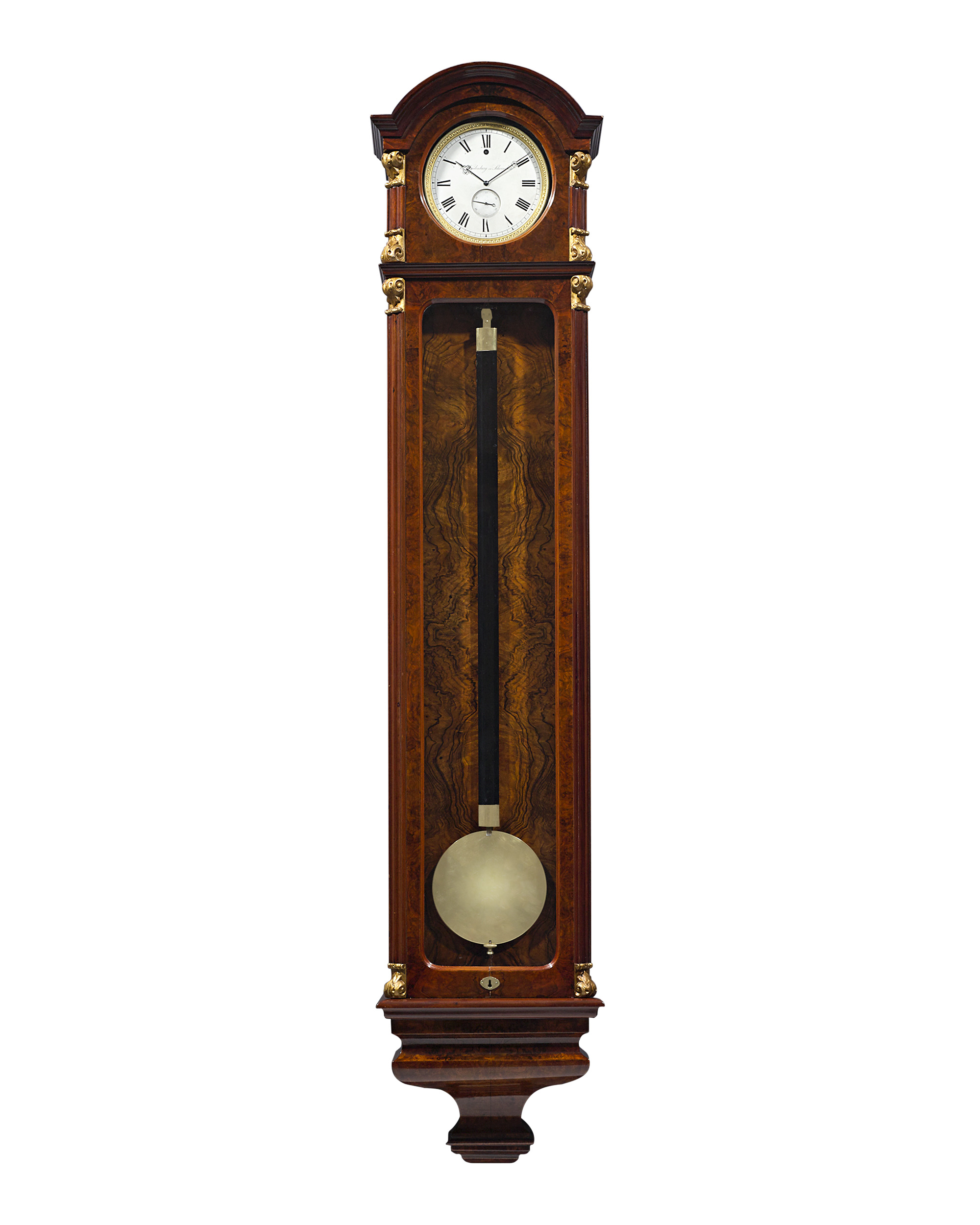
One-Year German Regulator Clock. Circa 1850

Pendulum clocks were more than simply utilitarian timekeepers; due to their high cost they were status symbols that expressed the wealth and culture of their owners. They evolved in a number of traditional styles, specific to different countries and times as well as their intended use. Case styles somewhat reflect the furniture styles popular during the period. Experts can often pinpoint when an antique clock was made within a few decades by subtle differences in their cases and faces. These are some of the different styles of pendulum clocks:

- Act of Parliament clock
- Anniversary clock (uses a torsion pendulum)
- Banjo clock
- Bracket clock
- Cartel clock
- Comtoise or Morbier clock
- Crystal regulator
- Cuckoo clock
- Grandfather clock
- Lantern clock
- Mantel clock
- Master clock
- Ogee clock
- Pillar clock
- Schoolhouse regulator
- Torsion pendulum clock
- Turret clock
- Vienna regulator
- Zaandam clock

== See also ==
- Pendulum (mathematics)
- Cycloidal pendulum
- Flying pendulum clock
- Steam clock
- Balance spring (hairspring)
