= John Ellicott =

John Ellicott may refer to:

- John Ellicott (clockmaker) (1706–1772), English clock and watchmaker
- John Ellicott (miller) (1739–1794), American miller
