= Timekeeper =

Instrument or person that measures the passage of time

A timekeeper is a person who measures the passage of time. They may have additional functions in sports and business.

== Description ==
A timekeeper is a person who measures time with the assistance of a clock or a stopwatch.

== Functions ==
=== Sports ===
In addition, a timekeeper records time, time taken, or time remaining during events such as sports matches. Along with the game clock, a timekeeper may be needed to manage clocks other gameplay clocks, including play clocks, pitch clocks, and shot clocks.

=== Business ===
In business, a timekeeper tracks employee time, potentially using a time clock. Collecting such data gives employers insight into a workforce so that a business can then make operational decisions to increase productivity and reduce labor costs.

== See also ==
- Atomic clock
- Chess clock
- History of timekeeping devices
- Fully automatic time
- Horology
- Referee
- Sense of time
- Stopwatch
- Time clock
- Timegrapher
- Timesheet
- Time tracking software
