= Ahasuerus Fromanteel =

English clockmaker

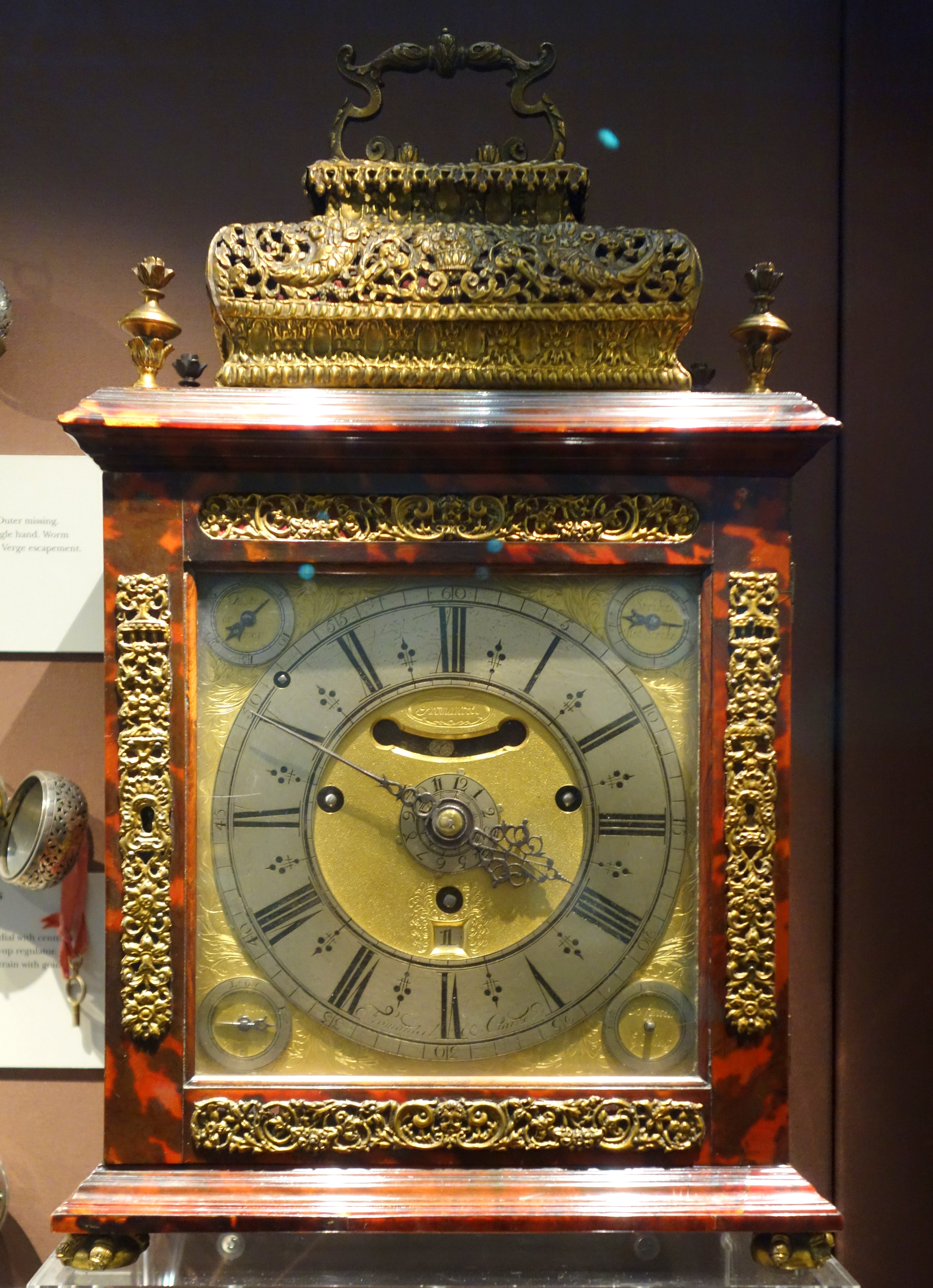
- Spring clock by Fromanteel or Fromanteel & Clarke, Amsterdam, c. 1695
- Born: Norwich, England
- Died: Whitechapel, London, England
- Occupation: Clockmaker
- Spouse(s): Maria de Bruijne; Sarah Winnock

Ahasuerus Fromanteel (circa 25 February 1607 – circa 31 January 1693) was a clockmaker, the first maker of pendulum clocks in Britain.

== Life and work ==
Fromanteel was baptised in Norwich on 25 February 1607. He was the first of five children born to Leah and Mordecai Fromanteel, a wood turner. The Fromanteels were a highly respected Flanders family of the sixteenth century. Following Spanish conquest, members of the family fled across the sea to East Anglia, establishing themselves in Colchester, Norwich, and London.

Ahasuerus Fromanteel was apprenticed for seven years to a blacksmith, before settling in London in 1629. He began as a crafter of steeple clocks in East Smithfield, near the Tower of London, becoming a member of Worshipful Company of Blacksmiths in 1631. He made lantern clocks with balance wheel escapement, and spring-driven table clocks, and joined the Clockmakers' Guild in 1632. In 1658 Fromanteel were taken before the guild for hiring more apprentices than the rules stipulated, which suggests that the firm was thriving. He developed microscopes and lenses, building on the work of Cornelis Drebbel and Benjamin Worsley in Amsterdam.

Fromanteel married Maria de Bruijne in 1631 and together they had eight children of whom four became clockmakers themselves. From birth Fromanteel was involved with the Dutch Reformed Church, however he and his wife were rebaptised and formally transferred to the Baptist faith.

=== Pendulum clocks ===
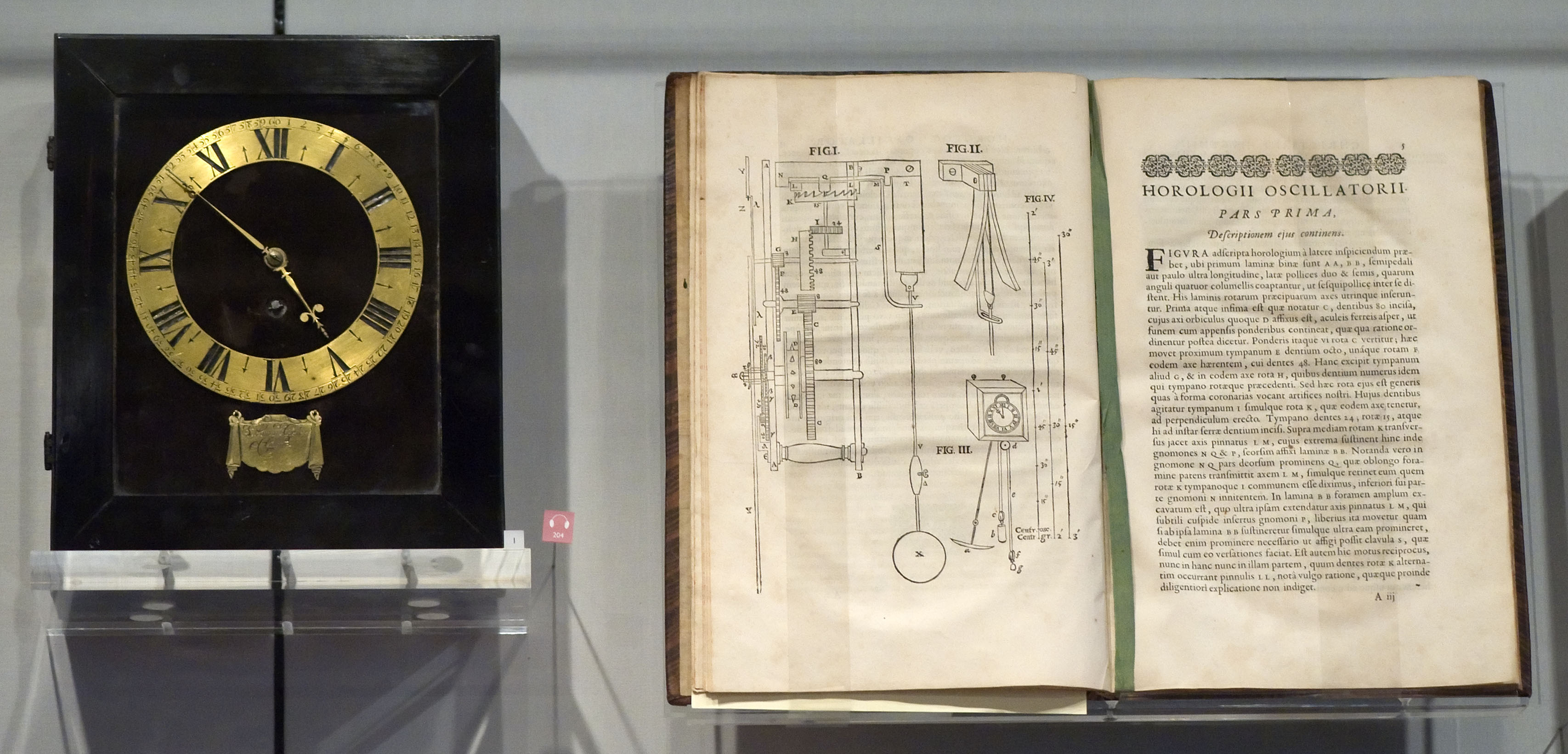
Pendulum clock (1657) invented by Christiaan Huygens, later adapted by Fromanteel for sale in England (1658). Exhibit in the Museum Boerhaave in Leiden.

In 1657 Ahasuerus's son John Fromanteel began studying pendulum clocks, invented by Christiaan Huygens (1656). Before the invention of the pendulum clock, timepieces were accurate to only within ten to fifteen minutes a day. The use of the pendulum made for near frictionless time keeping, ensuring that the mechanism lost measurement of only a few seconds a day: a sixty-fold improvement. It was termed a "horological breakthrough". This revolution in time keeping could be said to have caused industrial espionage on a grand scale. Although claimed by Samuel L. Macey to have caused "industrial espionage on a grand scale" it has been argued by Theodore M. Porter, that Macey fails to conform with the normal writings associated with history. That Macey can be accused of rambling and quite often losing the point of an argument he is trying to make. Therefore, there is not much academic scholarship to be associated with Macey's argument that Fromanteel was guilty of any form of espionage.

Following a trip to the Netherlands John and Ahasuerus implemented the new, more accurate pendulum technology. Fromanteel became the first maker of pendulum clocks in England, although this distinction has also been claimed by horologists Richard Harris and Robert Hooke. Precise measurement of time was critical for disciplines including maritime navigation and astronomy. Fromanteel used the design for regulating steeple and domestic clocks and sold them from the family house in Southwark and at a shop in Lothbury, which had been a famous retailer of clocks for more than a hundred years. The Fromanteel family sold also weight-driven clocks, watches that needed only a single annual winding and a variety of domestic and industrial engines, selling to the city of Norwich one of his patent fire engines.

In the Commonwealth Mercury of Thursday 25 November 1658 Fromanteel advertised :

clocks that go exact and keep equaller time than any now made without this regulator (examined and proved before his Highness the Lord Protector by such doctors, whose knowledge and learning is without exception) and are not subject to alter by change of weather, as others are, and may be made to go a week, a month, or a year with once winding up, as well as those that are wound up every day, and keep time as well, and is very excellent for all House Clocks that go either with springs or weights; and also Steeple Clocks that are most subject to differ by change of weather. Made by Ahasuerus Fromanteel, who made the first that were in England. You may have them at his house on the Bankside, in Mosses Alley, Southwark and at the sign of the Mermaid, in Lothbury, near Bartholomew Lane end, London.

He had gained the notice and patronage of "The Lord Protector", Oliver Cromwell, Britain's interregnum head of state. A popular legend developed that Cromwell himself owned such a clock, however there is little evidence to support this theory. As Mark Denny states in Five Machines That Changed the World, Fromanteel's patent "ushered in the age of English longcase clocks, which dominated horology for a century".

=== Later years ===
Fromanteel relocated back in the Netherlands in 1667–76. His son John was left in London to look after the business with Thomas Loomes, a former apprentice, married to Fromanteel's daughter Mary. Following the death of his wife Maria, Ahasuerus Fromanteel wed the widow Sarah Winnock (c. 1660). They lived in Whitechapel, where other of the Fromanteel family were established as silk weavers. Fromanteel died in 1693, and was interred at St Mary Matfelon, Whitechapel, on 31 January 1693. This church was destroyed in the Blitz, and Fromanteel's grave has been lost.

A Fromanteel brand-name of clocks and watches exists today, based in the Netherlands.
