= John Ellicott (clockmaker) =

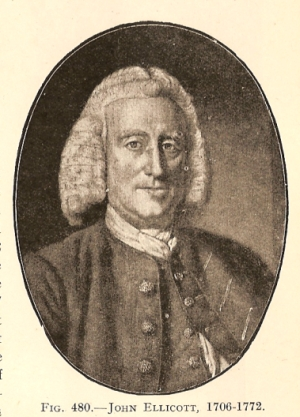

John Ellicott (London, 1706–1772), was an English clock and watchmaker of the 18th century.

His father, a Cornishman, John Ellicott (-1733), was also a clockmaker and had been admitted to the Clockmakers' Company in 1696. John Ellicott (jnr) conducted business first from Austin Friars Street EC2 and later from Swithin’s Alley, Royal Exchange, and in 1738 was elected Fellow of the Royal Society. He showed a keen interest in scientific matters and maintained an observatory at his home in Hackney. He was best known for his work on temperature compensated pendulums and his use of the cylinder escapement. His quality workmanship led to an appointment as Clockmaker to George III.

His son Edward (-1791), joined the business in 1760. Over their twelve-year partnership, their clocks were simply signed Ellicott, London.
