= Watch timing machine =

Machine that measures the accuracy of a mechanical watch

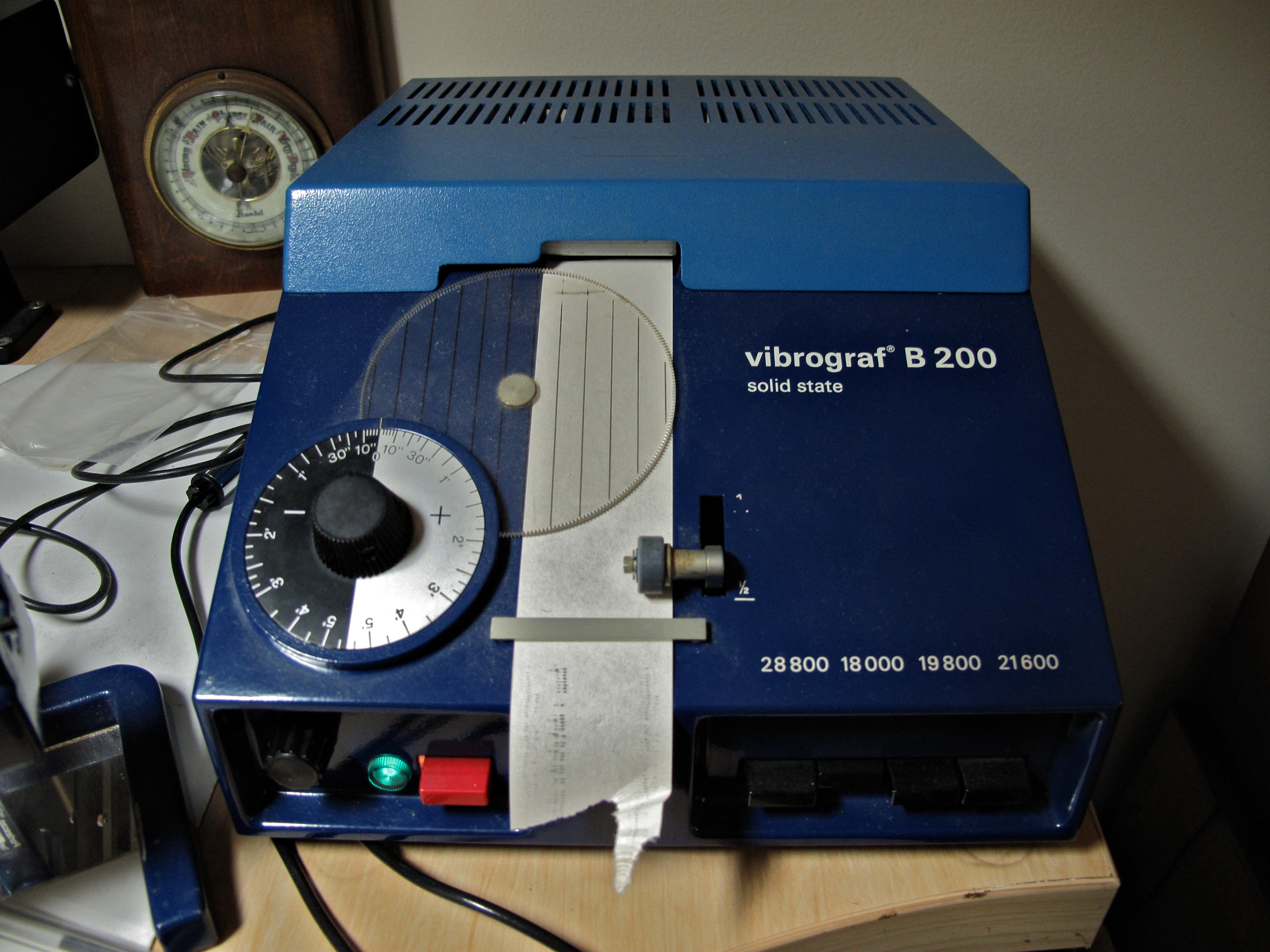
A watch timing machine by Vibrograf.

A watch timing machine or timegrapher is a machine that acoustically measures the ticks of a mechanical watch to assess its accuracy and enable calibration. This device calculates the amplitude, beat rate, and beat error of a mechanical watch, and provides a summary of these figures after the watch is connected to the device for a fixed interval of time. The information recorded by this instrument is used by horologists and watchmakers to help determine if the timepiece's movement is in need of servicing, or a complete overhaul, to restore its timekeeping accuracy. It is also used to determine if a newly produced timepiece is accurate, prior to being sold or released.
