= Seconds pendulum =

Pendulum whose period is precisely two seconds

A seconds pendulum, with a period of two seconds. Each swing takes one second.

A simple pendulum exhibits approximately simple harmonic motion under the conditions of no damping and small amplitude.

A seconds pendulum is a pendulum whose period is precisely two seconds; one second for a swing in one direction and one second for the return swing, a frequency of 0.5 Hz.

== Principles ==
A pendulum is a weight suspended from a pivot so that it can swing freely. When a pendulum is displaced sideways from its resting equilibrium position, it is subject to a restoring force due to gravity that will accelerate it back toward the equilibrium position. When released, the restoring force combined with the pendulum's mass causes it to oscillate about the equilibrium position, swinging back and forth. The time for one complete cycle, a left swing and a right swing, is called the period. The period depends on the length of the pendulum, and also to a slight degree on its weight distribution (the moment of inertia about its own center of mass) and the amplitude (width) of the pendulum's swing.

For a simple gravity pendulum — a point mass on a weightless string of length $\ell$ swinging with an infinitesimally small amplitude, without resistance — the period of the pendulum will be:

$$T=2\pi\sqrt{\frac \ell g}.$$

The length of the pendulum is a function of the time lapse of half a cycle $T_{1/2}$

$$\ell=g\left(\frac{T_{1/2}}{\pi}\right)^2.$$

With $T_{1/2}=1\ \mathrm{s}$, gives $g={\ell\cdot \pi^2}$ where g is the acceleration due to gravity, with quantity dimension of length per time squared. Using the standard acceleration of gravity g_{0} = 9.80665 m/s^{2}, the length of the string will be approximately 993.6 millimetres, i.e. less than a centimetre short of one metre everywhere on Earth.

The arc of a simple gravity pendulum is not isochronous motion: larger amplitude swings take slightly longer. To obtain motion independent of amplitude, the pendulum needs to move along a cycloidal path rather than a circle.

== Defining the second ==
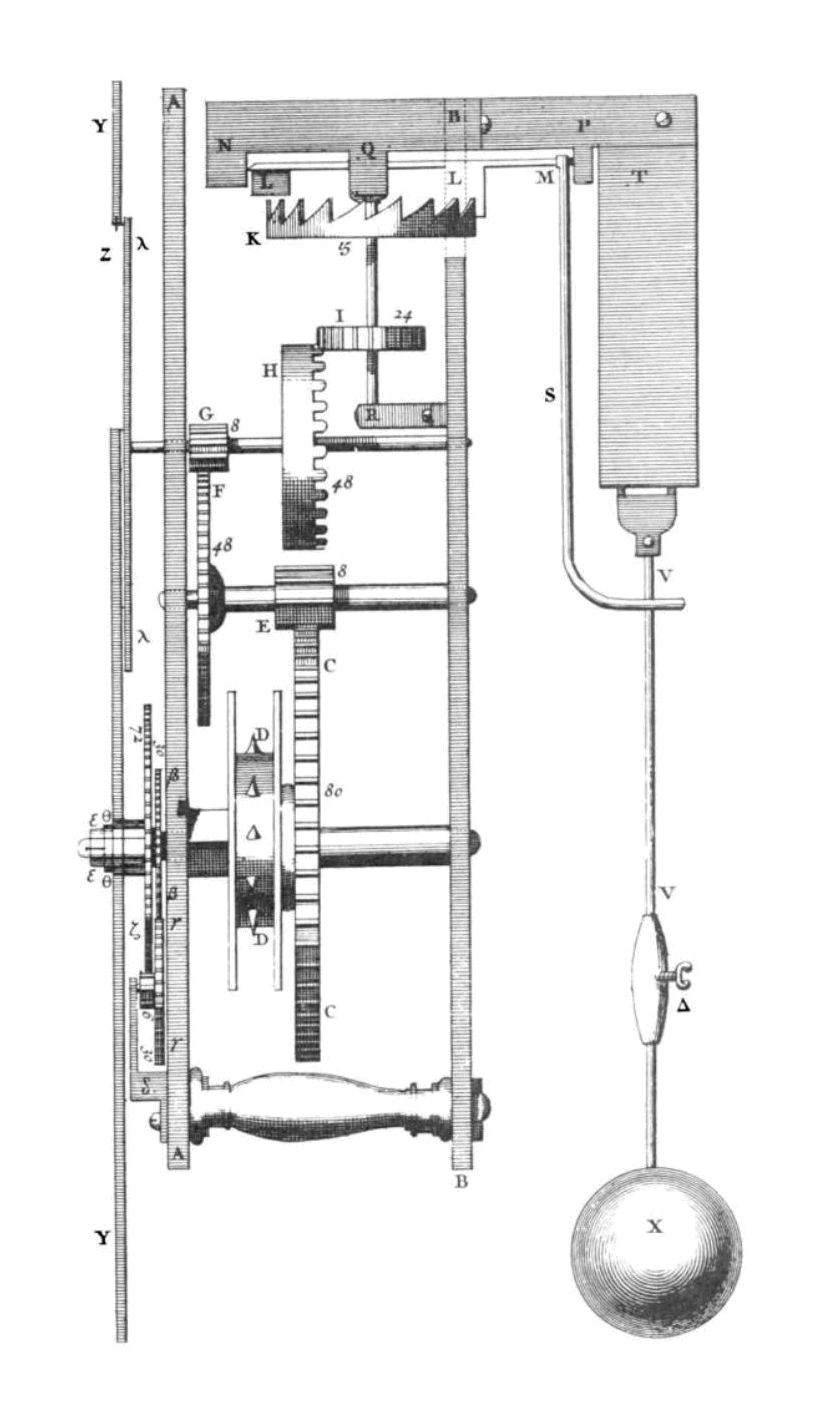
The seconds-pendulum clock built around 1673 by Christiaan Huygens, inventor of the pendulum clock. Drawing is from his treatise Horologium Oscillatorium, published 1673, Paris, and it records improvements to the mechanism that Huygens had illustrated in the 1658 publication of his invention, titled Horologium. It is a weight-driven clock (the weight chain is removed) with a verge escapement (K, L), with the one-second pendulum (X) suspended on a cord (V). The large metal plate (T) in front of the pendulum cord is the first illustration of Huygens' 'cycloidal cheeks', an attempt to improve accuracy by forcing the pendulum to follow a cycloidal path, making its swing isochronous. Huygens claimed it achieved an accuracy of ten seconds per day.

The pendulum clock was invented in 1656 by Dutch scientist and inventor Christiaan Huygens. Huygens was inspired by investigations of pendulums by Galileo Galilei beginning around 1602. Galileo discovered the key property that makes pendulums useful timekeepers: isochronism, which means that the period of swing of a pendulum is approximately the same for different sized swings. Galileo had the idea for a pendulum clock in 1637, which was partly constructed by his son in 1649, but neither lived to finish it.

The introduction of the pendulum, the first harmonic oscillator used in timekeeping, increased the accuracy of clocks enormously, from about 15 minutes per day to 15 seconds per day leading to their rapid spread as existing 'verge and foliot' clocks were retrofitted with pendulums.

These early clocks, due to their verge escapements, had wide pendulum swings of 80–100°. In his 1673 analysis of pendulums, Horologium Oscillatorium, Huygens showed that wide swings made the pendulum inaccurate, causing its period, and thus the rate of the clock, to vary with unavoidable variations in the driving force provided by the movement. He showed that wider swing of a pendulum following a cycloid motion instead of a simple circle would be more accurate. After developing some clocks to correct the motion with "cycloid cheeks", Huygens contracted the construction of clock designs to clockmaker Salomon Coster, who built the clocks accurate to one second per day.

Clockmakers' realisation that only pendulums with small swings of a few degrees are isochronous motivated the invention of the anchor escapement around 1670, which reduced the pendulum's swing to 4–6°. The anchor became the standard escapement used in pendulum clocks. In addition to increased accuracy, the anchor's narrow pendulum swing allowed the clock's case to accommodate longer, slower pendulums, which needed less power and caused less wear on the movement. The seconds pendulum (also called the Royal pendulum), 0.994 m (39.1 in) long, in which each swing takes one second, became widely used in quality clocks. The long narrow clocks built around these pendulums, first made by William Clement around 1680, became known as grandfather clocks. The increased accuracy resulting from these developments caused the minute hand, previously rare, to be added to clock faces beginning around 1690.

The 18th- and 19th-century wave of horological innovation that followed the invention of the pendulum brought many improvements to pendulum clocks. The deadbeat escapement invented in 1675 by Richard Towneley and popularised by George Graham around 1715 in his precision "regulator" clocks gradually replaced the anchor escapement and is now used in most modern pendulum clocks. The observation that pendulum clocks slowed down in summer brought the realisation that thermal expansion and contraction of the pendulum rod with changes in temperature was a source of error. This was solved by the invention of temperature-compensated pendulums; the mercury pendulum by George Graham in 1721 and the gridiron pendulum by John Harrison in 1726. With these improvements, by the mid-18th century precision pendulum clocks achieved accuracies of a few seconds per week.

At the time the second was defined as a fraction of the Earth's rotation time or mean solar day and determined by clocks whose precision was checked by astronomical observations. Solar time is a calculation of the passage of time based on the position of the Sun in the sky. The fundamental unit of solar time is the day. Two types of solar time are apparent solar time (sundial time) and mean solar time (clock time).

The delay curve—above the axis a sundial will appear fast relative to a clock showing local mean time, and below the axis a sundial will appear slow.

Mean solar time is the hour angle of the mean Sun plus 12 hours. This 12 hour offset comes from the decision to make each day start at midnight for civil purposes whereas the hour angle or the mean sun is measured from the zenith (noon). The duration of daylight varies during the year but the length of a mean solar day is nearly constant, unlike that of an apparent solar day. An apparent solar day can be 20 seconds shorter or 30 seconds longer than a mean solar day. Long or short days occur in succession, so the difference builds up until mean time is ahead of apparent time by about 14 minutes near February 6 and behind apparent time by about 16 minutes near November 3. The equation of time is this difference, which is cyclical and does not accumulate from year to year.

Mean time follows the mean sun. Jean Meeus describes the mean sun as follows:

"Consider a first fictitious Sun travelling along the ecliptic with a constant speed and coinciding with the true sun at the perigee and apogee (when the Earth is in perihelion and aphelion, respectively). Then consider a second fictitious Sun travelling along the celestial equator at a constant speed and coinciding with the first fictitious Sun at the equinoxes. This second fictitious sun is the mean Sun..."

In 1936 French and German astronomers found that Earth's rotation speed is irregular. Since 1967 atomic clocks define the second.

== Usage in metrology ==
In 1673 Huygens, having already developed a clock based on the pendulum, proposed to use the length of the pendulum arm for an international unit of length. The length of a seconds pendulum was determined (in toises) by Marin Mersenne in 1644. In 1660, the Royal Society proposed that it be the standard unit of length. In 1671 Jean Picard measured this length at the Paris observatory. He found the value of 440.5 lignes of the Toise of Châtelet which had been recently renewed. He proposed a universal toise (French: Toise universelle) which was twice the length of the seconds pendulum. However, it was soon discovered that the length of a seconds pendulum varies from place to place: French astronomer Jean Richer had measured the 0.3% difference in length between Cayenne (in what is now French Guiana) and Paris.

In 1790, Talleyrand proposed that the metre be the length of the seconds pendulum at a latitude of 45°. Despite the support of the Constituent Assembly, nothing came of Talleyrand's proposal. Instead of the seconds pendulum method, the commission of the French Academy of Sciences decided that the metre measure should be equal to one ten-millionth of the distance from the North Pole to the Equator (the quadrant of the Earth's circumference), measured along the meridian passing through Paris; in 1983 the unit was defined as the distance light travels in 1/299,792,458th of a second.

The idea of the seconds pendulum as a length standard did not die completely, and such a definition was used to define the yard in the United Kingdom. More precisely, it was decided in 1824 that if the genuine standard of the yard was lost, it could be restored by reference to the length of a pendulum vibrating seconds at London. However, when the primary Imperial yard standard was partially destroyed in 1834, a new standard of reference was constructed using copies of the "Standard Yard, 1760" instead of the pendulum's length as provided for in the Weights and Measures Act of 1824, because the pendulum method proved to be unreliable.

Defining a length by Talleyrand's method, with one-third of this length defining the foot, was also considered by Thomas Jefferson and others for redefining the yard in the United States shortly after gaining independence from the British Crown.

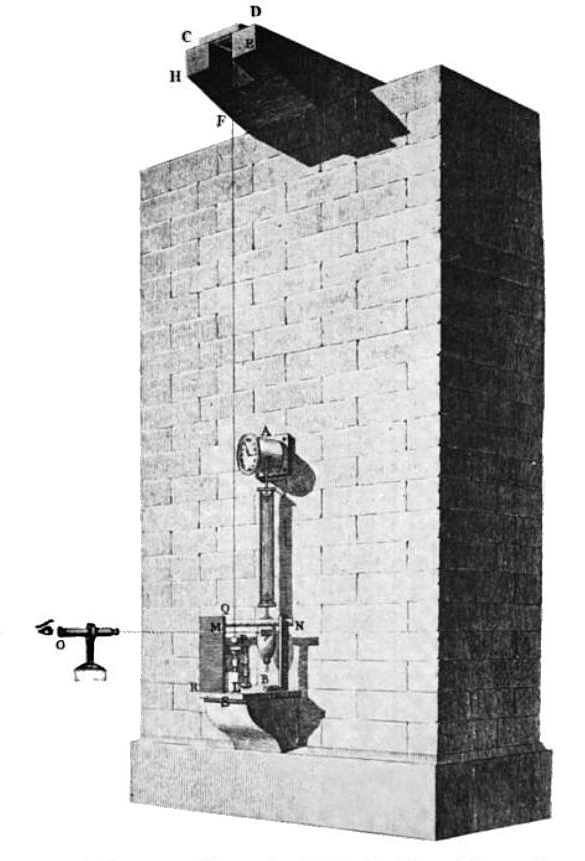
Drawing of pendulum experiment to determine the length of the seconds pendulum at Paris, conducted in 1792 by Jean-Charles de Borda and Jean-Dominique Cassini. From their original paper. They used a pendulum that consisted of a 1 1/2-inch (3.8 cm) platinum ball suspended by a 12-foot (3.97 m) iron wire (F,Q). It was suspended in front of the pendulum (B) of a precision clock (A).

== See also ==
- Pendulum (mechanics)
- Kater's pendulum
- Metre Convention
