= Christiaan Huygens =

Dutch mathematician and physicist (1629–1695)

Christiaan Huygens FRS
- Portrait by Caspar Netscher, 1671
- Born: 14 April 1629; The Hague, Dutch Republic
- Died: 8 July 1695 (aged 66); The Hague, Dutch Republic
- Education: University of Leiden; University of Angers
- Known for: List: Aerial telescope; Balance spring; Birefringence; Centrifugal force; Centripetal force; Collision formulae; Discovery of Titan; Explanation of Saturn's rings; Evolute; Gambler's ruin; Huygens's engine; Huygenian eyepiece; Huygens–Fresnel principle; Huygens's lemniscate; Huygens–Steiner theorem; Huygens's tritone; Involute; Injection locking; Repetition pitch; Magic lantern; Pendulum clock; Problem of points; Tautochrone curve; Tractrix; Wave theory; 31 equal temperament musical tuning
- Scientific career
- Fields: Mathematics; Physics; Astronomy; Mechanics; Horology
- Workplaces: Royal Society of London; French Academy of Sciences
- Academic advisors: Frans van Schooten

Signature
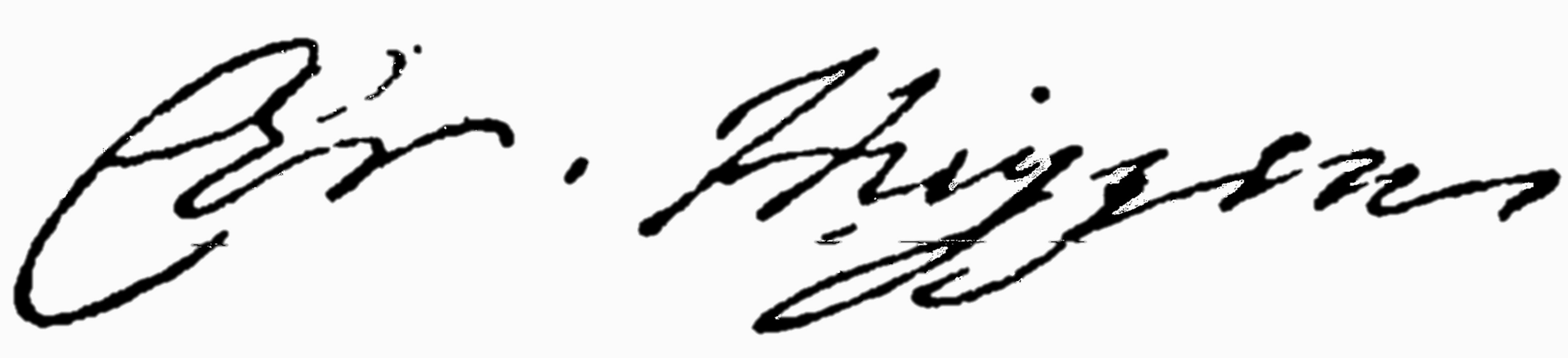

Christiaan Huygens, (Note: /ˈhaɪɡənz/ HY-gənz, US also /ˈhɔɪɡənz/ HOY-gənz; Dutch: [ˈkrɪstijaːn ˈɦœyɣə(n)s]; also spelled Huyghens; Latin: Hugenius) Lord of Zeelhem (14 April 1629 – 8 July 1695) was a Dutch mathematician, physicist, engineer, astronomer, and inventor who is regarded as a key figure in the Scientific Revolution. In physics, Huygens made seminal contributions to optics and mechanics, while as an astronomer he studied the rings of Saturn and discovered its largest moon, Titan. As an engineer and inventor, he improved the design of telescopes and invented the pendulum clock, the most accurate timekeeper for almost 300 years. A talented mathematician and physicist, Huygens authored the first modern treatise where a physical problem was idealized using mathematical parameters, while his work on light contains the first mathematical and mechanistic explanation of an unobservable physical phenomenon.

Huygens first identified the correct laws of elastic collision in his work De Motu Corporum ex Percussione, completed in 1656 but published posthumously in 1703. In 1659, Huygens derived geometrically the formula in classical mechanics for the centrifugal force in his work De Vi Centrifuga, a decade before Isaac Newton. In optics, he is best known for his wave theory of light, which he described in his Traité de la Lumière (1690). His theory of light was initially rejected in favour of Newton's corpuscular theory of light, until Augustin-Jean Fresnel adapted Huygens's principle to give a complete explanation of the rectilinear propagation and diffraction effects of light in 1821. Today this principle is known as the Huygens–Fresnel principle.

Huygens invented and patented the pendulum clock in 1657, which was manufactured in Paris by Isaac II Thuret. Huygens's horological research led to an extensive analysis of the pendulum in Horologium Oscillatorium (1673), regarded as one of the most important 17th-century works on mechanics. While it contains descriptions of clock designs, most of the book is an analysis of pendular motion and a theory of curves. In 1655, Huygens began grinding lenses with his brother Constantijn to build refracting telescopes. He discovered Saturn's biggest moon, Titan, and was the first to explain Saturn's strange appearance as due to "a thin, flat ring, nowhere touching, and inclined to the ecliptic". In 1662, he developed what is now called the Huygenian eyepiece, a telescope with two lenses to diminish the amount of dispersion.

As a mathematician, Huygens developed his theory of evolutes and wrote on games of chance and the problem of points in Van Rekeningh in Spelen van Gluck, which Frans van Schooten translated and published as De Ratiociniis in Ludo Aleae (1657). The use of expected values by Huygens and others would later inspire Jacob Bernoulli's work on probability theory.

== Biography ==
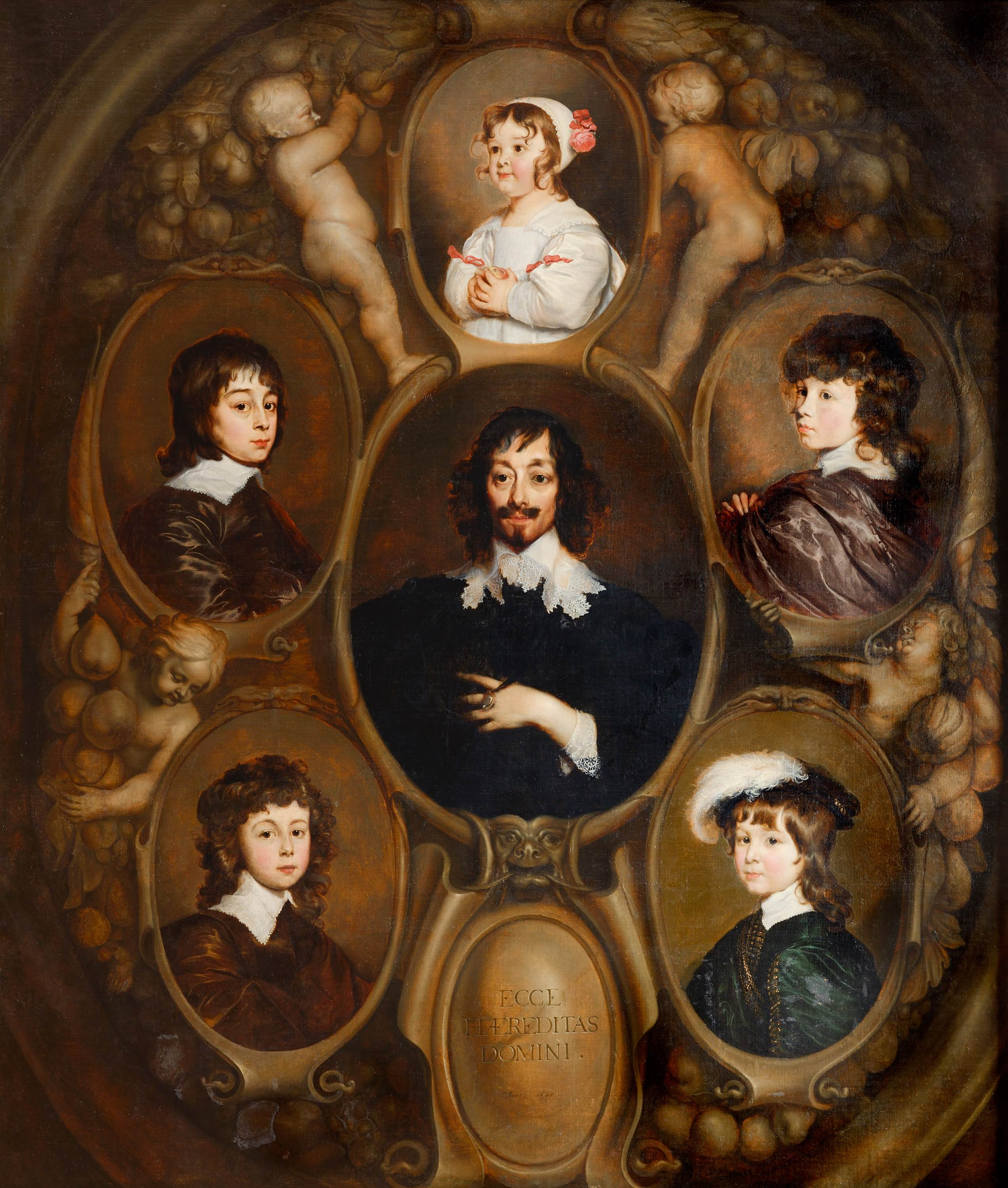
Constantijn surrounded by his five children (Christiaan, top right). Mauritshuis, The Hague.

Christiaan Huygens was born into a wealthy, influential Dutch family in The Hague on 14 April 1629, the second son of Constantijn Huygens. Christiaan was named after his paternal grandfather. His mother, Suzanna van Baerle, died shortly after giving birth to Huygens's sister. The couple had five children: Constantijn (1628), Christiaan (1629), Lodewijk (1631), Philips (1632) and Suzanna (1637).

Constantijn Huygens was a diplomat and advisor to the House of Orange, in addition to being a poet and a musician. He corresponded widely with intellectuals across Europe, including Galileo Galilei, Marin Mersenne, and René Descartes. Christiaan was educated at home until the age of sixteen, and from a young age liked to play with miniatures of mills and other machines. He received a liberal education from his father, studying languages, music, history, geography, mathematics, logic, and rhetoric, alongside dancing, fencing and horse riding.

In 1644, Huygens had as his mathematical tutor Jan Jansz Stampioen, who assigned the 15-year-old a demanding reading list on contemporary science. Descartes was later impressed by his skills in geometry, as was Mersenne, who christened him the "new Archimedes".

=== Student years ===
When Huygens was sixteen years old, Constantijn sent him to study law and mathematics at Leiden University, where he enrolled from May 1645 to March 1647. Frans van Schooten Jr., professor at Leiden's Engineering School, became private tutor to Huygens and his elder brother, Constantijn Jr., replacing Stampioen on the advice of Descartes. Van Schooten brought Huygens's mathematical education up to date, particularly on the work of Viète, Descartes, and Fermat.

After two years, starting in March 1647, Huygens continued his studies at the newly founded Orange College, in Breda, where his father was a curator. Constantijn Huygens was closely involved in the new college, which lasted only to 1669; the rector was André Rivet. Christiaan Huygens lived at the home of the jurist Johann Henryk Dauber while attending college, and had mathematics classes with the English lecturer John Pell. His time in Breda ended around the time when his brother Lodewijk, who was enrolled at the school, duelled with another student. Huygens left Breda after completing his studies in August 1649 and had a stint as a diplomat on a mission with Henry, Duke of Nassau. After stays at Bentheim and Flensburg in Germany, he visited Copenhagen and Helsingør in Denmark. Huygens hoped to cross the Øresund to see Descartes in Stockholm but Descartes died before he could do that.

Although his father Constantijn had wished his son Christiaan to be a diplomat, circumstances kept him from becoming so. The First Stadtholderless Period that began in 1650 meant that the House of Orange was no longer in power, removing Constantijn's influence. Further, he realized that his son had no interest in such a career.

=== Early correspondence ===
Drawing of a hanging chain (catenary) in a manuscript of Huygens

Huygens generally wrote in French or Latin. In 1646, while still a college student at Leiden, he began a correspondence with his father's friend, Marin Mersenne, who died soon afterwards in 1648. Mersenne wrote to Constantijn on his son's talent for mathematics, and flatteringly compared him to Archimedes on 3 January 1647.

The letters show Huygens's early interest in mathematics. In October 1646 he wrote about the shape of a suspension bridge, demonstrating that a hanging chain is not a parabola, as Galileo thought. Huygens would later label that curve the catenaria (catenary) in 1690 while corresponding with Gottfried Leibniz.

In the next two years (1647–48), Huygens's letters to Mersenne covered various topics, including a mathematical proof of the law of free fall, the claim by Grégoire de Saint-Vincent of circle quadrature, which Huygens showed to be wrong, the rectification of the ellipse, projectiles, and the vibrating string. Some of Mersenne's concerns at the time, such as the cycloid (he sent Huygens Torricelli's treatise on the curve), the centre of oscillation, and the gravitational constant, were matters Huygens only took seriously later in the 17th century. Mersenne had also written on musical theory. Huygens preferred meantone temperament; he innovated in 31 equal temperament (which was not itself a new idea but known to Francisco de Salinas), using logarithms to investigate it further and show its close relation to the meantone system.

In 1654, Huygens returned to his father's house in The Hague and was able to devote himself entirely to research. The family had another house, not far away at Hofwijck, and he spent time there during the summer. Despite being very active, his scholarly life did not allow him to escape bouts of depression.

Subsequently, Huygens developed a broad range of correspondents, though with some difficulty after 1648 due to the five-year Fronde in France. Visiting Paris in 1655, Huygens called on Ismael Boulliau to introduce himself, who took him to see Claude Mylon. The Parisian group of savants that had gathered around Mersenne held together into the 1650s, and Mylon, who had assumed the secretarial role, took some trouble to keep Huygens in touch. Through Pierre de Carcavi Huygens corresponded in 1656 with Pierre de Fermat, whom he admired greatly. The experience was bittersweet and somewhat puzzling since it became clear that Fermat had dropped out of the research mainstream, and his priority claims could probably not be made good in some cases. Besides, Huygens was looking by then to apply mathematics to physics, while Fermat's concerns ran to purer topics.

=== Scientific debut ===
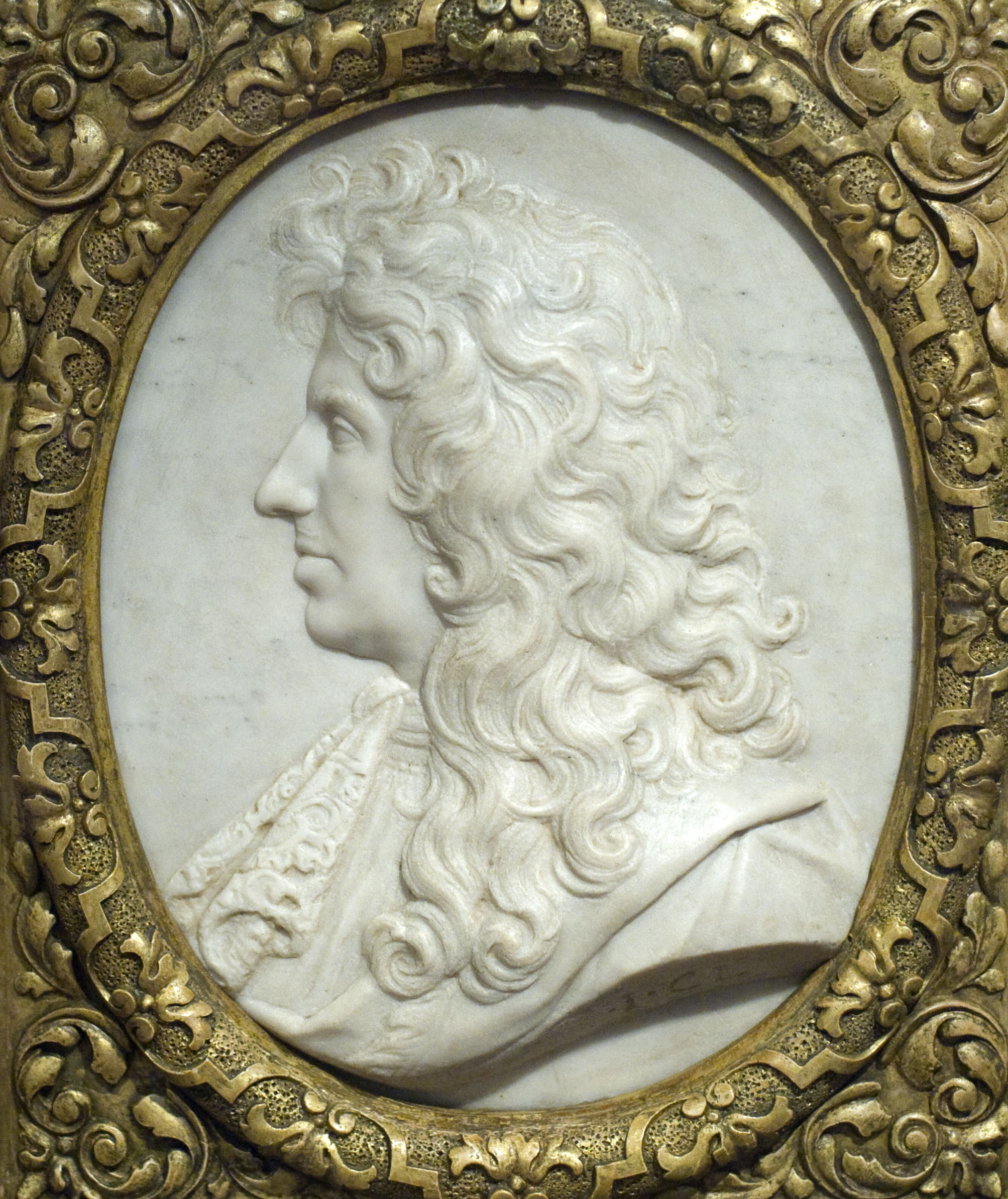
Christiaan Huygens, relief by Jean-Jacques Clérion (c. 1670)

Like some of his contemporaries, Huygens was often slow to commit his results and discoveries to print, preferring to disseminate his work through letters instead. In his early days, his mentor Frans van Schooten provided technical feedback and was cautious for the sake of his reputation.

Between 1651 and 1657, Huygens published a number of works that showed his talent for mathematics and his mastery of classical and analytical geometry, increasing his reach and reputation among mathematicians. Around the same time, Huygens began to question Descartes's laws of collision, which were largely wrong, deriving the correct laws algebraically and later by way of geometry. He showed that, for any system of bodies, the centre of gravity of the system remains the same in velocity and direction, which Huygens called the conservation of "quantity of movement". While others at the time were studying impact, Huygens's theory of collisions was more general. These results became the main reference point and the focus for further debates through correspondence and in a short article in Journal des Sçavans but would remain unknown to a larger audience until the publication of De Motu Corporum ex Percussione (Concerning the motion of colliding bodies) in 1703.

In addition to his mathematical and mechanical works, Huygens made important scientific discoveries: he was the first to identify Titan as one of Saturn's moons on 25 March 1655, invented the pendulum clock in 1657, and explained Saturn's strange appearance as due to a ring in 1659; all these discoveries brought him fame across Europe. On 3 May 1661, Huygens, together with astronomer Thomas Streete and Richard Reeve, observed the planet Mercury transit over the Sun using Reeve's telescope in London. Streete then debated the published record of Hevelius, a controversy mediated by Henry Oldenburg. Huygens passed to Hevelius a manuscript of Jeremiah Horrocks on the transit of Venus in 1639, printed for the first time in 1662.

In that same year, Sir Robert Moray sent Huygens John Graunt's life table, and shortly after Huygens and his brother Lodewijk dabbled on life expectancy. Huygens eventually created the first graph of a continuous distribution function under the assumption of a uniform death rate, and used it to solve problems in joint annuities. Contemporaneously, Huygens, who played the harpsichord, took an interest in Simon Stevin's theories on music; however, he showed very little concern to publish his theories on consonance, some of which were lost for centuries. For his contributions to science, the Royal Society of London elected Huygens a Fellow in 1663, making him its first foreign member when he was just 34 years old.

=== France ===
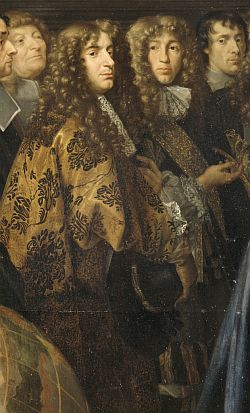
Huygens, right of centre, from L'établissement de l'Académie des Sciences et fondation de l'observatoire, 1666 by Henri Testelin (c. 1675)

The Montmor Academy, started in the mid-1650s, was the form the old Mersenne circle took after his death. Huygens took part in its debates and supported those favouring experimental demonstration as a check on amateurish attitudes. He visited Paris a third time in 1663; when the Montmor Academy closed down the next year, Huygens advocated for a more Baconian program in science. Two years later, in 1666, he moved to Paris on an invitation to fill a leadership position at King Louis XIV's new French Académie des sciences.

While at the Académie in Paris, Huygens had an important patron and correspondent in Jean-Baptiste Colbert, First Minister to Louis XIV. His relationship with the French Académie was not always easy, and in 1670 Huygens, seriously ill, chose Francis Vernon to carry out a donation of his papers to the Royal Society in London should he die. However, the aftermath of the Franco-Dutch War (1672–1678), and particularly England's role in it, may have damaged his later relationship with the Royal Society. Robert Hooke, as a Royal Society representative, lacked the finesse to handle the situation in 1673.

The physicist and inventor Denis Papin was an assistant to Huygens from 1671. One of their projects, which did not bear fruit directly, was the gunpowder engine, a precursor of the internal combustion engine that used gunpowder as its fuel. Huygens made further astronomical observations at the Académie using the observatory recently completed in 1672. He introduced Nicolaas Hartsoeker to French scientists such as Nicolas Malebranche and Giovanni Cassini in 1678.

The young diplomat Leibniz met Huygens while visiting Paris in 1672 on a vain mission to meet the French Foreign Minister Arnauld de Pomponne. Leibniz was working on a calculating machine at the time and, after a short visit to London in early 1673, he was tutored in mathematics by Huygens until 1676. An extensive correspondence ensued over the years, in which Huygens showed at first reluctance to accept the advantages of Leibniz's infinitesimal calculus.

=== Final years ===
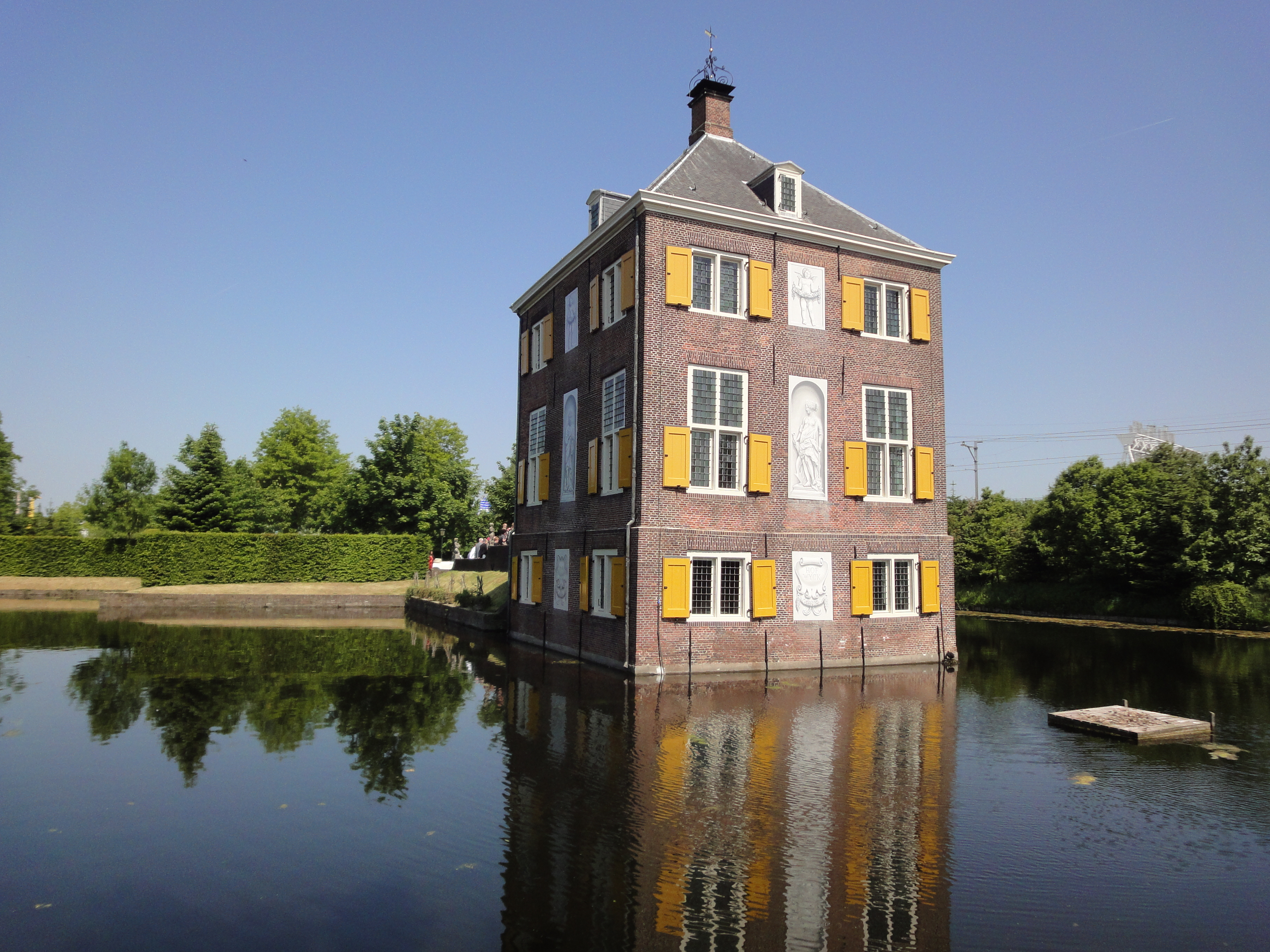
Hofwijck, Huygens's summer home; now a museum

Huygens moved back to The Hague in 1681 after suffering another bout of serious depressive illness. In 1684, he published Astroscopia Compendiaria on his new tubeless aerial telescope. He attempted to return to France in 1685 but the revocation of the Edict of Nantes precluded this move. His father died in 1687, and he inherited Hofwijck, which he made his home the following year.

On his third visit to England, Huygens met Newton in person on 12 June 1689. They spoke about Iceland spar, and subsequently corresponded about resisted motion.

Huygens returned to mathematical topics in his last years and observed the acoustical phenomenon now known as flanging in 1693. Two years later, on 8 July 1695, Huygens died in The Hague and was buried, like his father before him, in an unmarked grave at the Grote Kerk.

Huygens never married.

== Mathematics ==
Huygens first became internationally known for his work in mathematics, publishing a number of important results that drew the attention of many European geometers. Huygens's preferred method in his published works was that of Archimedes, though he made use of Descartes's analytic geometry and Fermat's infinitesimal techniques more extensively in his private notebooks.

=== Published works ===
==== Theoremata de Quadratura ====
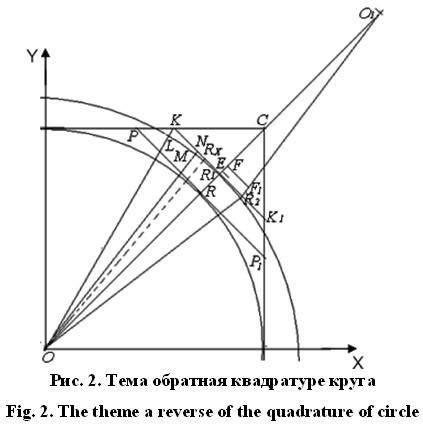
Huygens's first publication was in the field of quadrature.

Huygens's first publication was Theoremata de Quadratura Hyperboles, Ellipsis et Circuli (Theorems on the quadrature of the hyperbola, ellipse, and circle), published by the Elzeviers in Leiden in 1651. The first part of the work contained theorems for computing the areas of hyperbolas, ellipses, and circles that paralleled Archimedes's work on conic sections, particularly his Quadrature of the Parabola. The second part included a refutation to Grégoire de Saint-Vincent's claims on circle quadrature, which he had discussed with Mersenne earlier.

Huygens demonstrated that the centre of gravity of a segment of any hyperbola, ellipse, or circle was directly related to the area of that segment. He was then able to show the relationships between triangles inscribed in conic sections and the centre of gravity for those sections. By generalizing these theorems to cover all conic sections, Huygens extended classical methods to generate new results.

Quadrature and rectification were live issues in the 1650s and, through Mylon, Huygens participated in the controversy surrounding Thomas Hobbes. Persisting in highlighting his mathematical contributions, he made an international reputation.

==== De Circuli Magnitudine Inventa ====
Huygens's next publication was De Circuli Magnitudine Inventa (New findings on the magnitude of the circle), published in 1654. In this work, Huygens was able to narrow the gap between the circumscribed and inscribed polygons found in Archimedes's Measurement of the Circle, showing that the ratio of the circumference to its diameter or pi (π) must lie in the first third of that interval.

Using a technique equivalent to Richardson extrapolation, Huygens was able to shorten the inequalities used in Archimedes's method; in this case, by using the centre of the gravity of a segment of a parabola, he was able to approximate the centre of gravity of a segment of a circle, resulting in a faster and accurate approximation of the circle quadrature. From these theorems, Huygens obtained two set of values for π: the first between 3.1415926 and 3.1415927, and the second between 3.1415926533 and 3.1415926538.

Huygens also showed that, in the case of the hyperbola, the same approximation with parabolic segments produces a quick and simple method to calculate logarithms. He appended a collection of solutions to classical problems at the end of the work under the title Illustrium Quorundam Problematum Constructiones (Construction of some illustrious problems).

==== De Ratiociniis in Ludo Aleae ====
Huygens became interested in games of chance after he visited Paris in 1655 and encountered the work of Fermat, Blaise Pascal and Girard Desargues years earlier. He eventually published what was, at the time, the most coherent presentation of a mathematical approach to games of chance in De Ratiociniis in Ludo Aleae (On reasoning in games of chance). Frans van Schooten translated the original Dutch manuscript into Latin and published it in his Exercitationum Mathematicarum (1657).

The work contains early game-theoretic ideas and deals in particular with the problem of points. Huygens took from Pascal the concepts of a "fair game" and equitable contract (i.e., equal division when the chances are equal), and extended the argument to set up a non-standard theory of expected values. His success in applying algebra to the realm of chance, which hitherto seemed inaccessible to mathematicians, demonstrated the power of combining Euclidean synthetic proofs with the symbolic reasoning found in the works of Viète and Descartes.

Huygens included five challenging problems at the end of the book that became the standard test for anyone wishing to display their mathematical skill in games of chance for the next sixty years. People who worked on these problems included Abraham de Moivre, Jacob Bernoulli, Johannes Hudde, Baruch Spinoza, and Leibniz.

=== Unpublished work ===
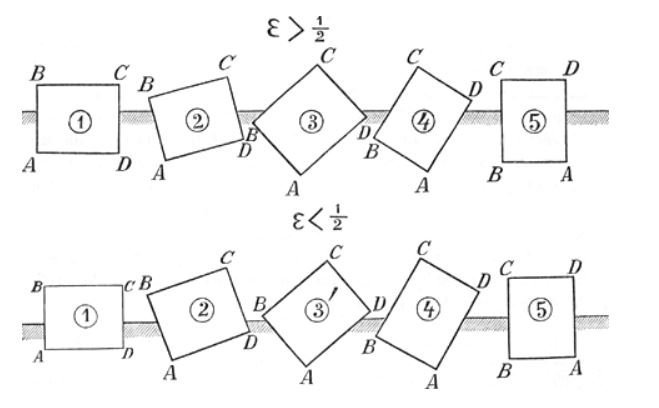
Huygens's results for the stability of a floating rectangular parallelepiped

Huygens had earlier completed a manuscript in the manner of Archimedes's On Floating Bodies entitled De Iis quae Liquido Supernatant (About parts floating above liquids). It was written around 1650 and was made up of three books. Although he sent the completed work to Frans van Schooten for feedback, in the end Huygens chose not to publish it, and at one point suggested it be burned. Some of the results found here were not rediscovered until the eighteenth and nineteenth centuries.

Huygens first re-derives Archimedes's solutions for the stability of the sphere and the paraboloid by a clever application of Torricelli's principle (i.e., that bodies in a system move only if their centre of gravity descends). He then proves the general theorem that, for a floating body in equilibrium, the distance between its centre of gravity and its submerged portion is at a minimum. Huygens uses this theorem to arrive at original solutions for the stability of floating cones, parallelepipeds, and cylinders, in some cases through a full cycle of rotation. His approach was thus equivalent to the principle of virtual work. Huygens was also the first to recognize that, for these homogeneous solids, their specific weight and their aspect ratio are the essentials parameters of hydrostatic stability.

== Natural philosophy ==
Huygens was the leading European natural philosopher between Descartes and Newton. However, unlike many of his contemporaries, Huygens had no taste for grand theoretical or philosophical systems and generally avoided dealing with metaphysical issues (if pressed, he adhered to the Cartesian philosophy of his time). Instead, Huygens excelled in extending the work of his predecessors, such as Galileo, to derive solutions to unsolved physical problems that were amenable to mathematical analysis. In particular, he sought explanations that relied on contact between bodies and avoided action at a distance.

In common with Robert Boyle and Jacques Rohault, Huygens advocated an experimentally oriented, mechanical natural philosophy during his Paris years. Already in his first visit to England in 1661, Huygens had learnt about Boyle's air pump experiments during a meeting at Gresham College. Shortly afterwards, he reevaluated Boyle's experimental design and developed a series of experiments meant to test a new hypothesis. It proved a yearslong process that brought to the surface a number of experimental and theoretical issues, and which ended around the time he became a Fellow of the Royal Society. Despite the replication of results of Boyle's experiments trailing off messily, Huygens came to accept Boyle's view of the void against the Cartesian denial of it.

Newton's influence on John Locke was mediated by Huygens, who assured Locke that Newton's mathematics was sound, leading to Locke's acceptance of a corpuscular-mechanical physics.

=== Laws of motion, impact, and gravitation ===
==== Elastic collisions ====
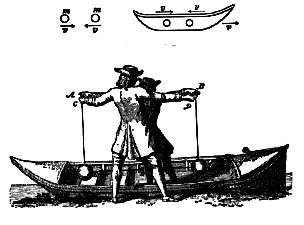
A boating metaphor as a way to think about relative motion, simplifying the theory of colliding bodies, from Huygens's Oeuvres Complètes

The general approach of the mechanical philosophers was to postulate theories of the kind now called "contact action". Huygens adopted this method but not without seeing its limitations, while Leibniz, his student in Paris, later abandoned it. Understanding the universe this way made the theory of collisions central to physics, as only explanations that involved matter in motion could be truly intelligible. While Huygens was influenced by the Cartesian approach, he was less doctrinaire. He studied elastic collisions in the 1650s but delayed publication for over a decade.

Huygens concluded quite early that Descartes's laws for elastic collisions were largely wrong, and he formulated the correct laws, including the conservation of the product of mass times the square of the speed for hard bodies, and the conservation of quantity of motion in one direction for all bodies. An important step was his recognition of the Galilean invariance of the problems. Huygens had worked out the laws of collision from 1652 to 1656 in a manuscript entitled De Motu Corporum ex Percussione, though his results took many years to be circulated. In 1661, he passed them on in person to William Brouncker and Christopher Wren in London. What Spinoza wrote to Henry Oldenburg about them in 1666, during the Second Anglo-Dutch War, was guarded. The war ended in 1667, and Huygens announced his results to the Royal Society in 1668. He later published them in the Journal des Sçavans in 1669.

==== Centrifugal force ====
In 1659 Huygens found the constant of gravitational acceleration and stated what is now known as the second of Newton's laws of motion in quadratic form. He derived geometrically the now standard formula for the centrifugal force, exerted on an object when viewed in a rotating frame of reference, for instance when driving around a curve. In modern notation:

$$F_{c}={m\ \omega^2}{r}$$

with m the mass of the object, ω the angular velocity, and r the radius. Huygens collected his results in a treatise under the title De Vi Centrifuga, unpublished until 1703, where the kinematics of free fall were used to produce the first generalized conception of force prior to Newton.

==== Gravitation ====
The general idea for the centrifugal force, however, was published in 1673 and was a significant step in studying orbits in astronomy. It enabled the transition from Kepler's third law of planetary motion to the inverse square law of gravitation. Yet, the interpretation of Newton's work on gravitation by Huygens differed from that of Newtonians such as Roger Cotes: he did not insist on the a priori attitude of Descartes, but neither would he accept aspects of gravitational attractions that were not attributable in principle to contact between particles.

The approach used by Huygens also missed some central notions of mathematical physics, which were not lost on others. In his work on pendulums Huygens came very close to the theory of simple harmonic motion; the topic, however, was covered fully for the first time by Newton in Book II of the Principia Mathematica (1687). In 1678 Leibniz picked out of Huygens's work on collisions the idea of conservation law that Huygens had left implicit.

=== Horology ===
==== Pendulum clock ====
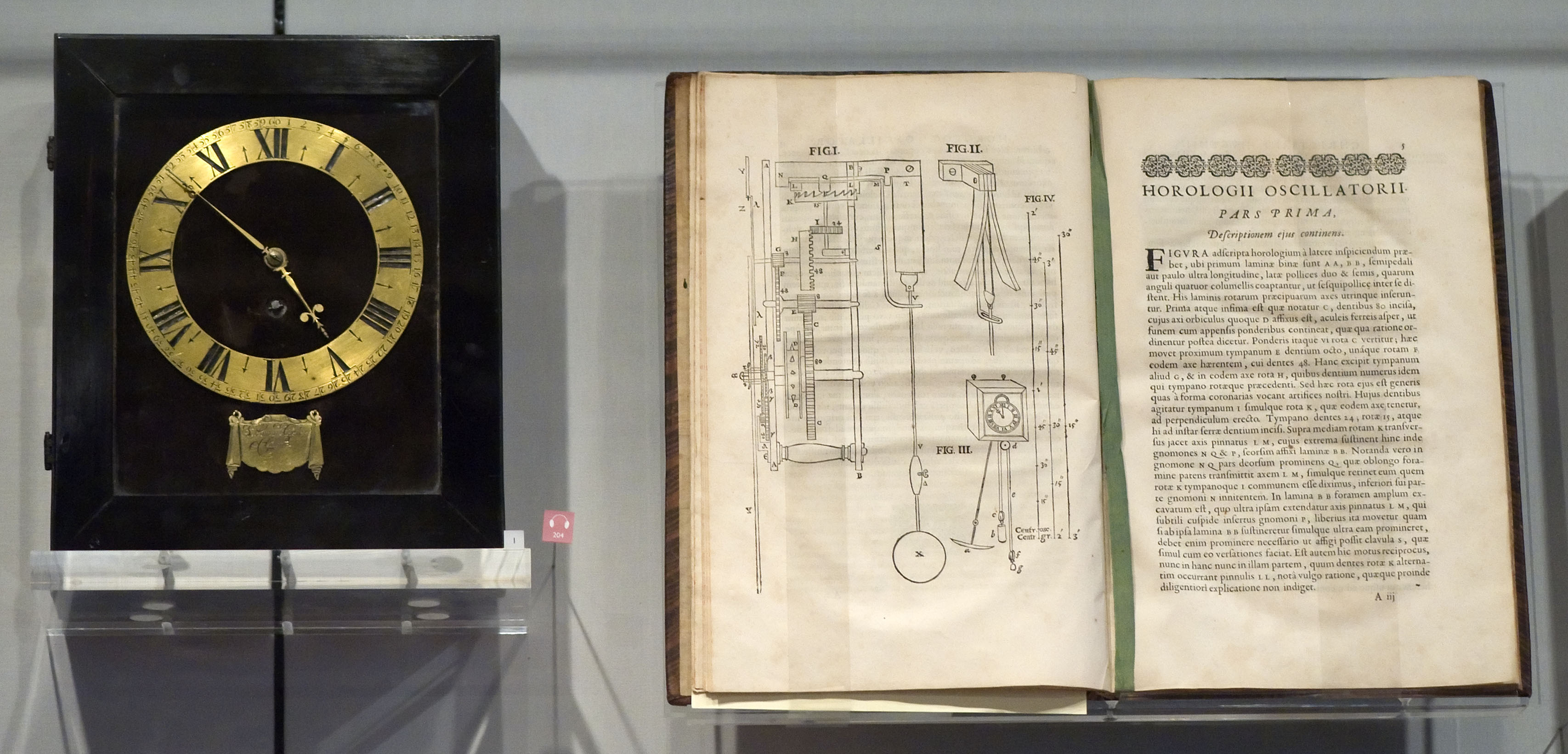
Spring-driven pendulum clock, designed by Huygens and built by Salomon Coster (1657), with a copy of the Horologium Oscillatorium (1673), at Museum Boerhaave, Leiden

In 1657, inspired by earlier research into pendulums as regulating mechanisms, Huygens invented the pendulum clock, which was a breakthrough in timekeeping and became the most accurate timekeeper for almost 300 years until the 1930s. The pendulum clock was much more accurate than the existing verge and foliot clocks and was immediately popular, quickly spreading over Europe. Clocks prior to this would lose about 15 minutes per day, whereas Huygens's clock would lose about 15 seconds per day. Although Huygens patented and contracted the construction of his clock designs to Salomon Coster in The Hague, he did not make much money from his invention. Pierre Séguier refused him any French rights, while Simon Douw in Rotterdam and Ahasuerus Fromanteel in London copied his design in 1658. The oldest known Huygens-style pendulum clock is dated 1657 and can be seen at the Museum Boerhaave in Leiden.

Part of the incentive for inventing the pendulum clock was to create an accurate marine chronometer that could be used to find longitude by celestial navigation during sea voyages. However, the clock proved unsuccessful as a marine timekeeper because the rocking motion of the ship disturbed the motion of the pendulum. In 1660, Lodewijk Huygens made a trial on a voyage to Spain, and reported that heavy weather made the clock useless. Alexander Bruce entered the field in 1662, and Huygens called in Sir Robert Moray and the Royal Society to mediate and preserve some of his rights. Trials continued into the 1660s, the best news coming from a Royal Navy captain Robert Holmes operating against the Dutch possessions in 1664. Lisa Jardine doubts that Holmes reported the results of the trial accurately, as Samuel Pepys expressed his doubts at the time.

A trial for the French Academy on an expedition to Cayenne ended badly. Jean Richer suggested correction for the figure of the Earth. By the time of the Dutch East India Company expedition of 1686 to the Cape of Good Hope, Huygens was able to supply the correction retrospectively.

==== Horologium Oscillatorium ====
Diagram showing the evolute of a curve

Sixteen years after the invention of the pendulum clock, in 1673, Huygens published his major work on horology entitled Horologium Oscillatorium: Sive de Motu Pendulorum ad Horologia Aptato Demonstrationes Geometricae (The Pendulum Clock: or Geometrical demonstrations concerning the motion of pendula as applied to clocks). It is the first modern work on mechanics where a physical problem is idealized by a set of parameters then analysed mathematically.

Huygens's motivation came from the observation, made by Mersenne and others, that pendulums are not quite isochronous: their period depends on their width of swing, with wide swings taking slightly longer than narrow swings. He tackled this problem by finding the curve down which a mass will slide under the influence of gravity in the same amount of time, regardless of its starting point; the so-called tautochrone problem. By geometrical methods which anticipated the calculus, Huygens showed it to be a cycloid, rather than the circular arc of a pendulum's bob, and therefore that pendulums needed to move on a cycloid path in order to be isochronous. The mathematics necessary to solve this problem led Huygens to develop his theory of evolutes, which he presented in Part III of his Horologium Oscillatorium.

He also solved a problem posed by Mersenne earlier: how to calculate the period of a pendulum made of an arbitrarily-shaped swinging rigid body. This involved discovering the centre of oscillation and its reciprocal relationship with the pivot point. In the same work, he analysed the conical pendulum, consisting of a weight on a cord moving in a circle, using the concept of centrifugal force.

Huygens was the first to derive the formula for the period of an ideal mathematical pendulum (with mass-less rod or cord and length much longer than its swing), in modern notation:

$$T = 2 \pi \sqrt{\frac{l}{g}}$$

with T the period, l the length of the pendulum and g the gravitational acceleration. By his study of the oscillation period of compound pendulums Huygens made pivotal contributions to the development of the concept of moment of inertia.

Huygens also observed coupled oscillations: two of his pendulum clocks mounted next to each other on the same support often became synchronized, swinging in opposite directions. He reported the results by letter to the Royal Society, and it is referred to as "an odd kind of sympathy" in the Society's minutes. This concept is now known as entrainment.

==== Balance spring watch ====
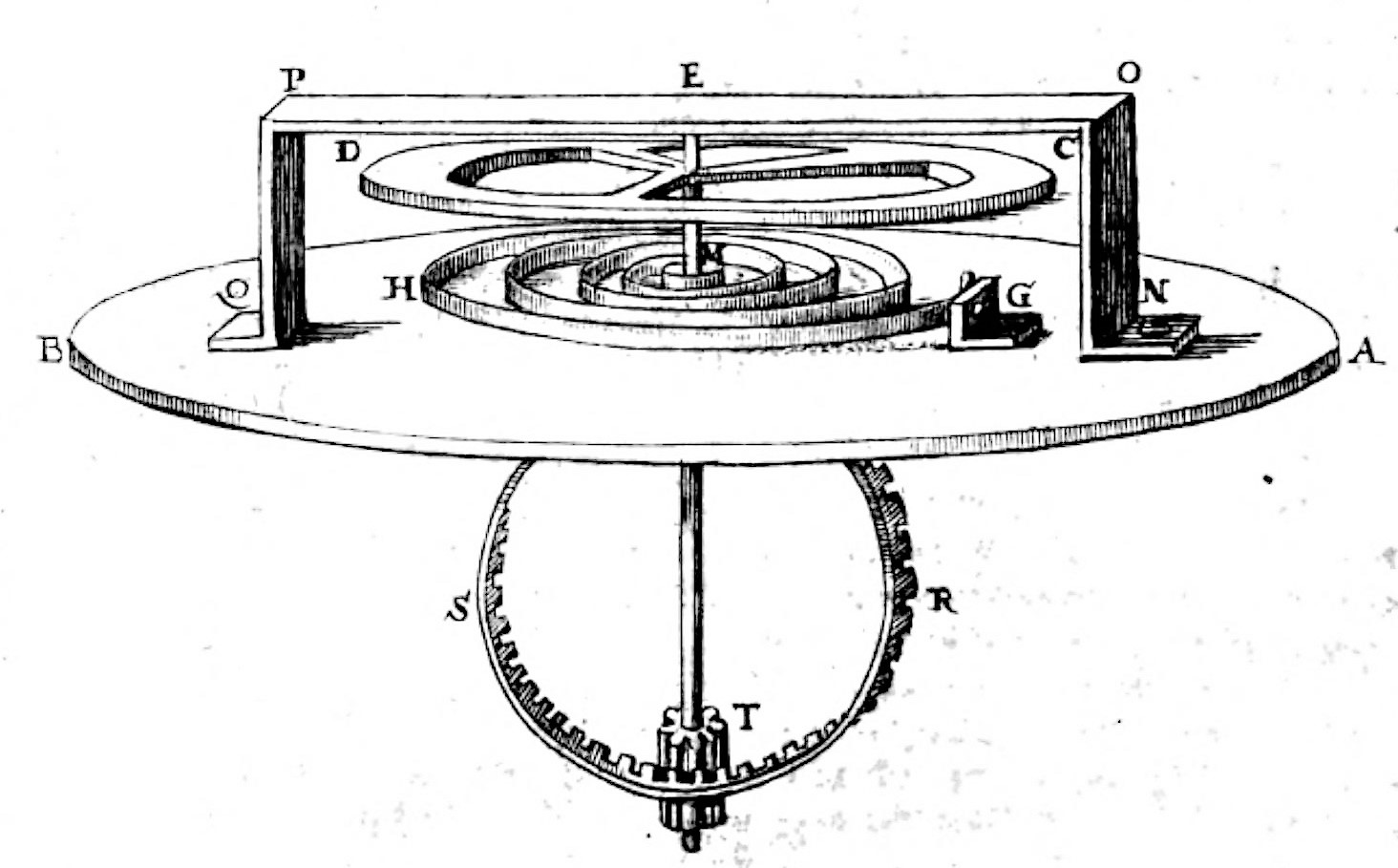
Drawing of a balance spring invented by Huygens

In 1675, while investigating the oscillating properties of the cycloid, Huygens was able to transform a cycloidal pendulum into a vibrating spring through a combination of geometry and higher mathematics. In the same year, Huygens designed a spiral balance spring and patented a pocket watch. These watches are notable for lacking a fusee for equalizing the mainspring torque. The implication is that Huygens thought his spiral spring would isochronize the balance in the same way that cycloid-shaped suspension curbs on his clocks would isochronize the pendulum.

He later used spiral springs in more conventional watches, made for him by Thuret in Paris. Such springs are essential in modern watches with a detached lever escapement because they can be adjusted for isochronism. Watches in Huygens's time, however, employed the very ineffective verge escapement, which interfered with the isochronal properties of any form of balance spring, spiral or otherwise.

Huygens's design came around the same time as, though independently of, Robert Hooke's. Controversy over the priority of the balance spring persisted for centuries. In February 2006, a long-lost copy of Hooke's handwritten notes from several decades of Royal Society meetings was discovered in a cupboard in Hampshire, England, presumably tipping the evidence in Hooke's favour.

=== Optics ===
==== Dioptrics ====
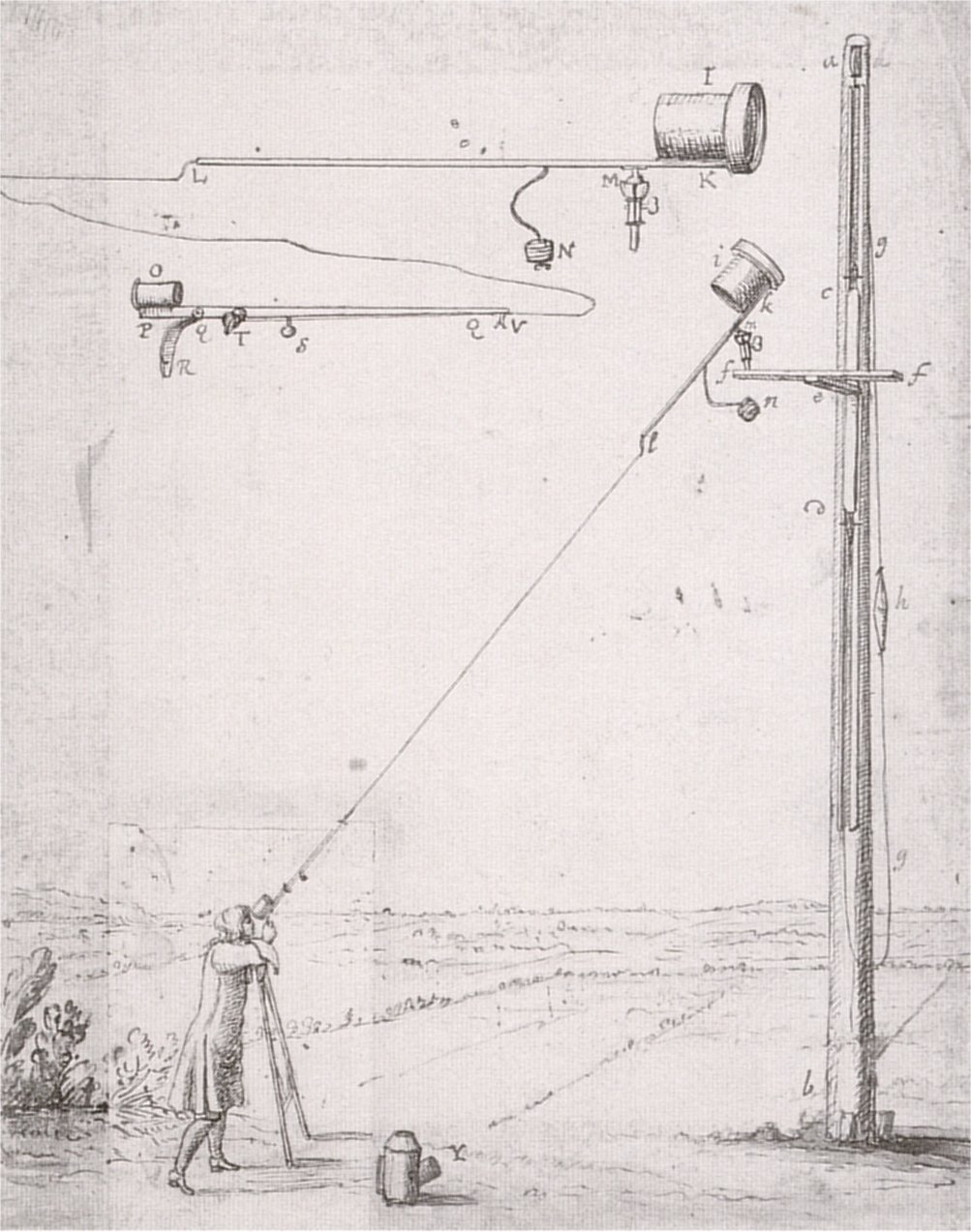
Huygens's aerial telescope from Astroscopia Compendiaria (1684)

Huygens had a long-term interest in the study of light refraction and lenses or dioptrics. From 1652 date the first drafts of a Latin treatise on the theory of dioptrics, known as the Tractatus, which contained a comprehensive and rigorous theory of the telescope. Huygens was one of the few to raise theoretical questions regarding the properties and working of the telescope, and almost the only one to direct his mathematical proficiency towards the actual instruments used in astronomy.

Huygens repeatedly announced its publication to his colleagues but ultimately postponed it in favor of a much more comprehensive treatment, now under the name of the Dioptrica. It consisted of three parts. The first part focused on the general principles of refraction, the second dealt with spherical and chromatic aberration, while the third covered all aspects of the construction of telescopes and microscopes. In contrast to Descartes's dioptrics which treated only ideal (elliptical and hyperbolical) lenses, Huygens dealt exclusively with spherical lenses, which were the only kind that could really be made and incorporated in devices such as microscopes and telescopes.

Huygens also worked out practical ways to minimize the effects of spherical and chromatic aberration, such as long focal distances for the objective of a telescope, internal stops to reduce the aperture, and a new kind of ocular known as the Huygenian eyepiece. The Dioptrica was never published in Huygens's lifetime and only appeared in press in 1703, when most of its contents were already familiar to the scientific world.

==== Lenses ====
Together with his brother Constantijn, Huygens began grinding his own lenses in 1655 in an effort to improve telescopes. He designed in 1662 what is now called the Huygenian eyepiece, a set of two planoconvex lenses used as a telescope ocular. Huygens's lenses were known to be of superb quality and polished consistently according to his specifications; however, his telescopes did not produce very sharp images, leading some to speculate that he might have suffered from near-sightedness.

Lenses were also a common interest through which Huygens could meet socially in the 1660s with Spinoza, who ground them professionally. They had rather different outlooks on science, Spinoza being the more committed Cartesian, and some of their discussion survives in correspondence. He encountered the work of Antoni van Leeuwenhoek, another lens grinder, in the field of microscopy which interested his father. Huygens also investigated the use of lenses in projectors. He is credited as the inventor of the magic lantern, described in correspondence of 1659. There are others to whom such a lantern device has been attributed, such as Giambattista della Porta and Cornelis Drebbel, though Huygens's design used lens for better projection (Athanasius Kircher has also been credited for that).

==== Traité de la Lumière ====
Refraction of a plane wave, explained using Huygens's principle in Traité de la Lumière (1690)

Huygens is especially remembered in optics for his wave theory of light, which he first communicated in 1678 to the Académie des sciences in Paris. Originally a preliminary chapter of his Dioptrica, Huygens's theory was published in 1690 under the title Traité de la Lumière (Treatise on light), and contains the first fully mathematized, mechanistic explanation of an unobservable physical phenomenon (i.e., light propagation). Huygens refers to Ignace-Gaston Pardies, whose manuscript on optics helped him on his wave theory.

The challenge at the time was to explain geometrical optics, as most physical optics phenomena (such as diffraction) had not been observed or appreciated as issues. Huygens had experimented in 1672 with double refraction (birefringence) in the Iceland spar (a calcite), a phenomenon discovered in 1669 by Rasmus Bartholin. At first, he could not elucidate what he found but was later able to explain it using his wavefront theory and concept of evolutes. He also developed ideas on caustics. Huygens assumes that the speed of light is finite, based on a report by Ole Christensen Rømer in 1677 but which Huygens is presumed to have already believed. Huygens's theory posits light as radiating wavefronts, with the common notion of light rays depicting propagation normal to those wavefronts. Propagation of the wavefronts is then explained as the result of spherical waves being emitted at every point along the wave front (known today as the Huygens–Fresnel principle). It assumed an omnipresent ether, with transmission through perfectly elastic particles, a revision of the view of Descartes. The nature of light was therefore a longitudinal wave.

His theory of light was not widely accepted, while Newton's rival corpuscular theory of light, as found in his Opticks (1704), gained more support. One strong objection to Huygens's theory was that longitudinal waves have only a single polarization which cannot explain the observed birefringence. However, Thomas Young's interference experiments in 1801, and François Arago's detection of the Poisson spot in 1819, could not be explained through Newton's or any other particle theory, reviving Huygens's ideas and wave models. Fresnel became aware of Huygens's work and in 1821 was able to explain birefringence as a result of light being not a longitudinal (as had been assumed) but actually a transverse wave. The thus-named Huygens–Fresnel principle was the basis for the advancement of physical optics, explaining all aspects of light propagation until Maxwell's electromagnetic theory culminated in the development of quantum mechanics and the discovery of the photon.

=== Astronomy ===
==== Systema Saturnium ====
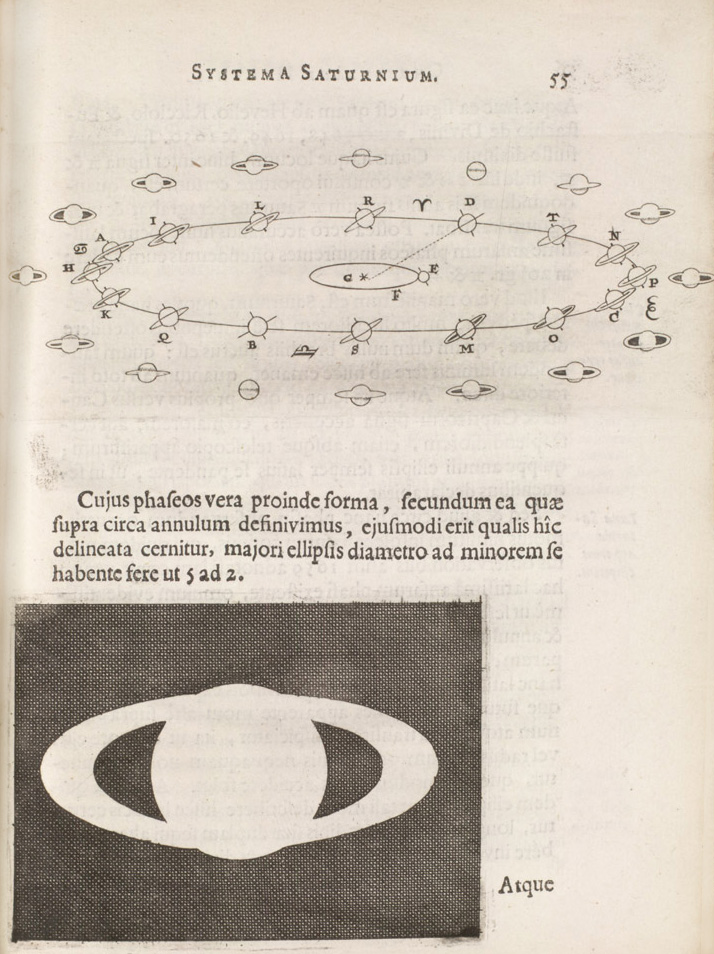
Huygens's explanation for the aspects of Saturn, Systema Saturnium (1659)

In 1655, Huygens discovered the first of Saturn's moons, Titan, and observed and sketched the Orion Nebula using a refracting telescope with a 43x magnification of his own design. Huygens succeeded in subdividing the nebula into different stars (the brighter interior now bears the name of the Huygenian region in his honour), and discovered several interstellar nebulae and some double stars. He was also the first to propose that the appearance of Saturn, which had baffled astronomers, was due to "a thin, flat ring, nowhere touching, and inclined to the ecliptic”.

More than three years later, in 1659, Huygens published his theory and findings in Systema Saturnium. It is considered the most important work on telescopic astronomy since Galileo's Sidereus Nuncius fifty years earlier. Much more than a report on Saturn, Huygens provided measurements for the relative distances of the planets from the Sun, introduced the concept of the micrometer, and showed a method to measure angular diameters of planets, which finally allowed the telescope to be used as an instrument to measure (rather than just sighting) astronomical objects. He was also the first to question the authority of Galileo in telescopic matters, a sentiment that was to be common in the years following its publication.

In the same year, Huygens was able to observe Syrtis Major, a volcanic plain on Mars. He used repeated observations of the movement of this feature over the course of a number of days to estimate the length of day on Mars, which he did quite accurately to 24 1/2 hours. This figure is only a few minutes off of the actual length of the Martian day of 24 hours, 37 minutes.

==== Planetarium ====
At the instigation of Jean-Baptiste Colbert, Huygens undertook the task of constructing a mechanical planetarium that could display all the planets and their moons then known circling around the Sun. Huygens completed his design in 1680 and had his clockmaker Johannes van Ceulen build it the following year. However, Colbert died in the interim and Huygens never got to deliver his planetarium to the French Academy of Sciences as the new minister, François-Michel le Tellier, decided not to renew Huygens's contract.

In his design, Huygens made an ingenious use of continued fractions to find the best rational approximations by which he could choose the gears with the correct number of teeth. The ratio between two gears determined the orbital periods of two planets. To move the planets around the Sun, Huygens used a clock-mechanism that could go forwards and backwards in time. Huygens claimed his planetarium was more accurate that a similar device constructed by Ole Rømer around the same time, but his planetarium design was not published until after his death in the Opuscula Posthuma (1703).

==== Cosmotheoros ====
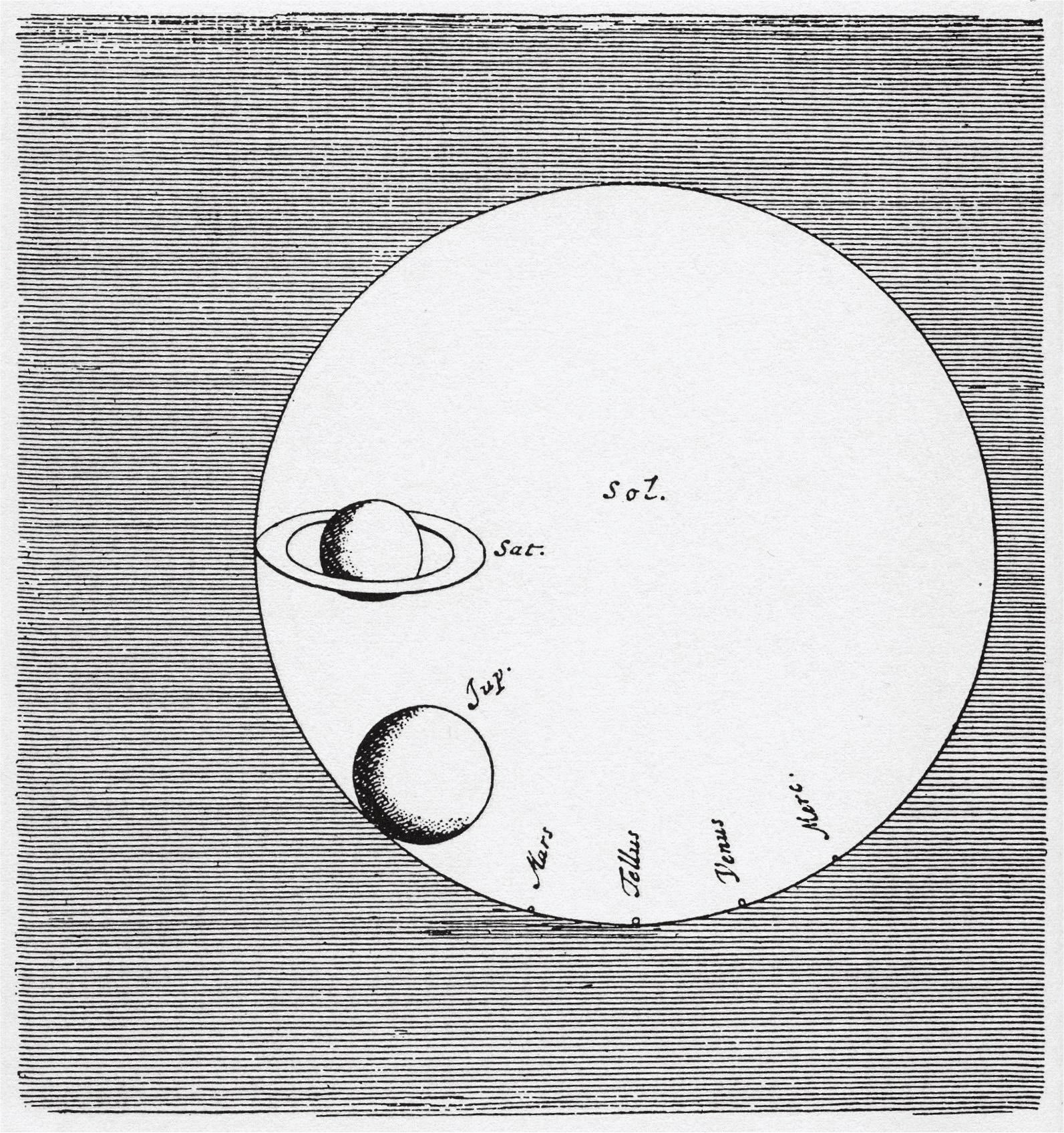
Relative sizes of the Sun and planets in Cosmotheoros (1698)

Shortly before his death in 1695, Huygens completed his most speculative work entitled Cosmotheoros. At his direction, it was to be published only posthumously by his brother, which Constantijn Jr. did in 1698. In this work, Huygens speculated on the existence of extraterrestrial life, which he imagined similar to that on Earth. Such speculations were not uncommon at the time, justified by Copernicanism or the plenitude principle, but Huygens went into greater detail, though without acknowledging Newton's laws of gravitation or the fact that planetary atmospheres are composed of different gases. Cosmotheoros, translated into English as The celestial worlds discover’d, is fundamentally a utopian work that owes some inspiration to the work of Peter Heylin, and it was likely seen by contemporary readers as a piece of fiction in the tradition of Francis Godwin, John Wilkins, and Cyrano de Bergerac.

Huygens wrote that availability of water in liquid form was essential for life and that the properties of water must vary from planet to planet to suit the temperature range. He took his observations of dark and bright spots on the surfaces of Mars and Jupiter to be evidence of water and ice on those planets. He argued that extraterrestrial life is neither confirmed nor denied by the Bible, and questioned why God would create the other planets if they were not to serve a greater purpose than that of being admired from Earth. Huygens postulated that the great distance between the planets signified that God had not intended for beings on one to know about the beings on the others, and had not foreseen how much humans would advance in scientific knowledge.

It was also in this book that Huygens published his estimates for the relative sizes of the Solar System and his method for calculating stellar distances. He made a series of smaller holes in a screen facing the Sun, until he estimated the light was of the same intensity as that of the star Sirius. He then calculated that the angle of this hole was 1/27,664th the diameter of the Sun, and thus it was about 30,000 times as far away, on the (incorrect) assumption that Sirius is as luminous as the Sun. The subject of photometry remained in its infancy until the time of Pierre Bouguer and Johann Heinrich Lambert.

== Legacy ==
Huygens has been called the first theoretical physicist and a founder of modern mathematical physics. Although his influence was considerable during his lifetime, it began to fade shortly after his death. His skills as a geometer and mechanical ingenuity elicited the admiration of many of his contemporaries, including Isaac Newton, Gottfried Wilhelm Leibniz, Guillaume de l'Hôpital, and the Bernoullis. For his work in physics, Huygens has been deemed one of the greatest scientists in the Scientific Revolution, rivaled only by Newton in both depth of insight and the number of results obtained. He also helped develop the institutional frameworks for scientific research on the European continent, making him a leading actor in the establishment of modern science.

=== Mathematics and physics ===
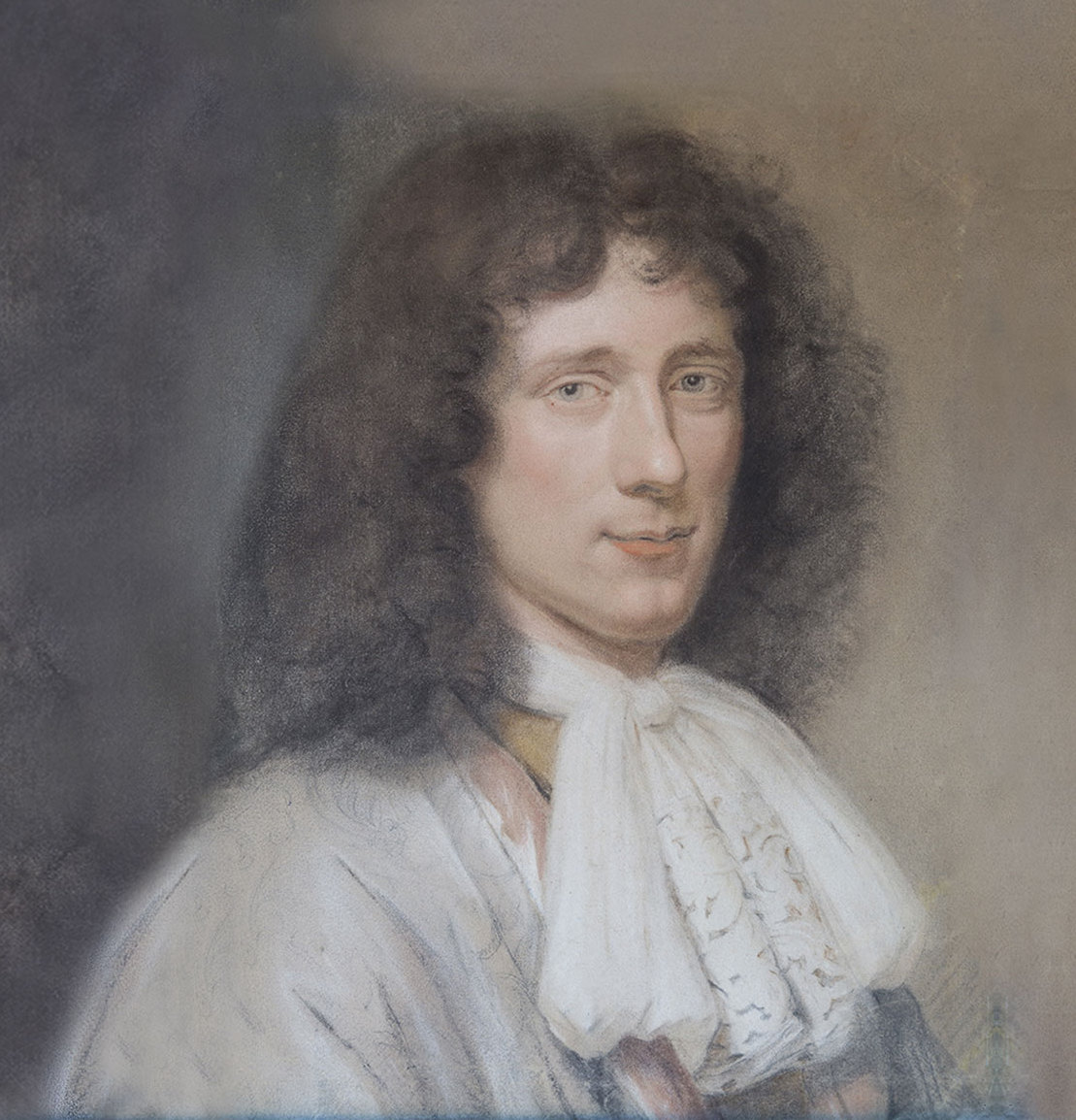
Portrait of Christiaan Huygens by Bernard Vaillant (1686)

In mathematics, Huygens mastered the methods of ancient Greek geometry, particularly the work of Archimedes, and was an adept user of the analytic geometry and infinitesimal techniques of Descartes and Fermat. His mathematical style can be best described as geometrical infinitesimal analysis of curves and of motion. Drawing inspiration and imagery from mechanics, it remained pure mathematics in form. Huygens brought this type of geometrical analysis to a close, as more mathematicians turned away from classical geometry to the calculus for handling infinitesimals, limit processes, and motion.

Huygens was moreover able to fully employ mathematics to answer questions of physics. Often this entailed introducing a simple model for describing a complicated situation, then analyzing it starting from simple arguments to their logical consequences, developing the necessary mathematics along the way. As he wrote at the end of a draft of De Vi Centrifuga:

Whatever you will have supposed not impossible either concerning gravity or motion or any other matter, if then you prove something concerning the magnitude of a line, surface, or body, it will be true; as for instance, Archimedes on the quadrature of the parabola, where the tendency of heavy objects has been assumed to act through parallel lines.

Huygens favoured axiomatic presentations of his results, which require rigorous methods of geometric demonstration: although he allowed levels of uncertainty in the selection of primary axioms and hypotheses, the proofs of theorems derived from these could never be in doubt. Huygens's style of publication exerted an influence in Newton's presentation of his own major works.

Besides the application of mathematics to physics and physics to mathematics, Huygens relied on mathematics as methodology, specifically its ability to generate new knowledge about the world. Unlike Galileo, who used mathematics primarily as rhetoric or synthesis, Huygens consistently employed mathematics as a way to discover and develop theories covering various phenomena and insisted that the reduction of the physical to the geometrical satisfy exacting standards of fit between the real and the ideal. In demanding such mathematical tractability and precision, Huygens set an example for eighteenth-century scientists such as Johann Bernoulli, Jean le Rond d'Alembert, and Charles-Augustin de Coulomb.

Although never intended for publication, Huygens made use of algebraic expressions to represent physical entities in a handful of his manuscripts on collisions. This would make him one of the first to employ mathematical formulae to describe relationships in physics, as it is done today. Huygens also came close to the modern idea of limit while working on his Dioptrica, though he never used the notion outside geometrical optics.

==== Later influence ====
Huygens's standing as the greatest scientist in Europe was eclipsed by Newton's at the end of the seventeenth century, despite the fact that, as Hugh Aldersey-Williams notes, "Huygens's achievement exceeds that of Newton in some important respects". Although his journal publications anticipated the form of the modern scientific article, his persistent classicism and reluctance to publish his work did much to diminish his influence in the aftermath of the Scientific Revolution, as adherents of Leibniz’ calculus and Newton's physics took centre stage.

Huygens's analyses of curves that satisfy certain physical properties, such as the cycloid, led to later studies of many other such curves like the caustic, the brachistochrone, the sail curve, and the catenary. His application of mathematics to physics, such as in his studies of impact and birefringence, would inspire new developments in mathematical physics and rational mechanics in the following centuries (albeit in the new language of the calculus). Additionally, Huygens developed the oscillating timekeeping mechanisms, the pendulum and the balance spring, that have been used ever since in mechanical watches and clocks. These were the first reliable timekeepers fit for scientific use (e.g., to make accurate measurements of the inequality of the solar day, which was not possible before). His work in this area foreshadowed the union of applied mathematics with mechanical engineering in the centuries that followed.

=== Portraits ===
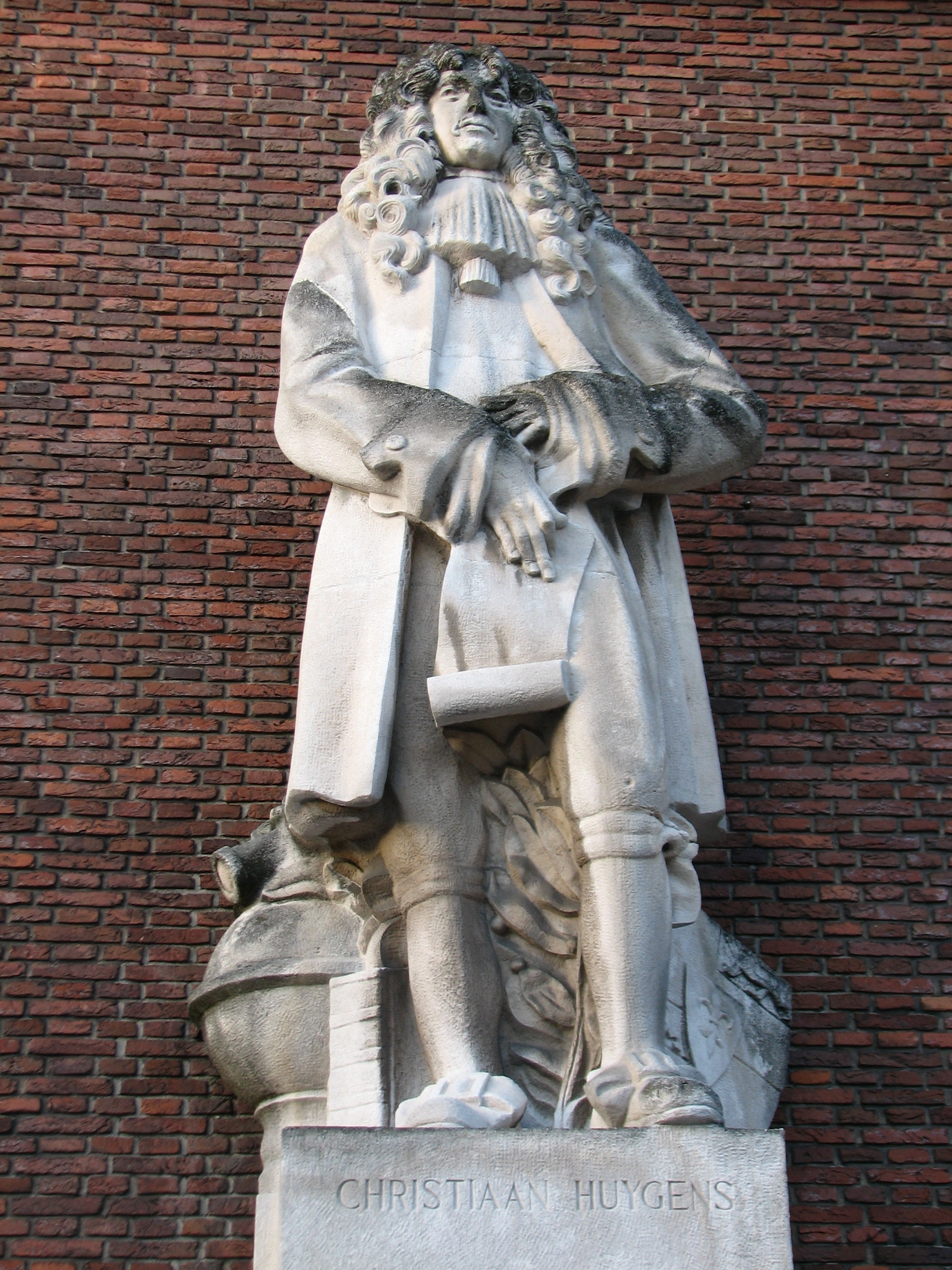
A statue of Huygens in Rotterdam

During his lifetime, Huygens and his father had a number of portraits commissioned. These included:

- 1639 – Constantijn Huygens in the midst of his five children by Adriaen Hanneman, painting with medallions, Mauritshuis, The Hague
- 1671 – Portrait by Caspar Netscher, Museum Boerhaave, Leiden, loan from Haags Historisch Museum
- c. 1675 – Depiction of Huygens in Établissement de l'Académie des Sciences et fondation de l'observatoire, 1666 by Henri Testelin. Colbert presents the members of the newly founded Académie des Sciences to king Louis XIV of France. Musée National du Château et des Trianons de Versailles, Versailles
- 1679 – Medaillon portrait in relief by the French sculptor Jean-Jacques Clérion
- 1686 – Portrait in pastel by Bernard Vaillant, Museum Hofwijck, Voorburg
- 1684 to 1687 – Engravings by G. Edelinck after the painting by Caspar Netscher
- 1688 – Portrait by Pierre Bourguignon (painter), Royal Netherlands Academy of Arts and Sciences, Amsterdam

=== Commemorations ===
A number of monuments to Christiaan Huygens can be found across important cities in the Netherlands, including Rotterdam, Delft, and Leiden.

The European Space Agency's probe aboard the Cassini spacecraft that landed on Titan, Saturn's largest moon, in 2005 was named after him.

== Works ==
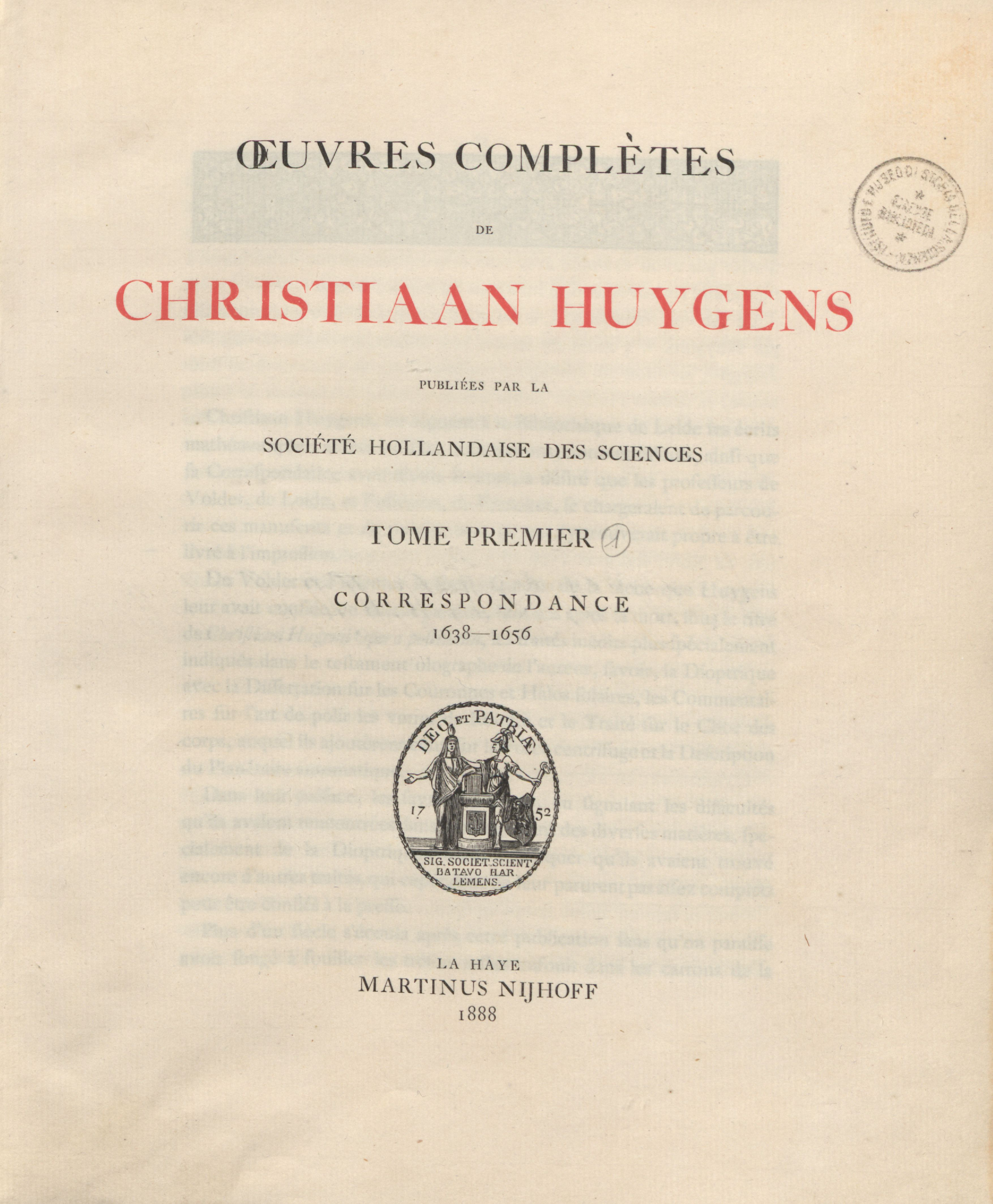
Title page of Oeuvres Complètes I

- 1650 – De Iis Quae Liquido Supernatant (About parts floating above liquids), unpublished.
- 1651 – Theoremata de Quadratura Hyperboles, Ellipsis et Circuli, republished in Oeuvres Complètes, Tome XI.
- 1651 – Epistola, qua diluuntur ea quibus 'Εξέτασις [Exetasis] Cyclometriae Gregori à Sto. Vincentio impugnata fuit, supplement.
- 1654 – De Circuli Magnitudine Inventa.
- 1654 – Illustrium Quorundam Problematum Constructiones, supplement.
- 1655 – Horologium (The clock), short pamphlet on the pendulum clock.
- 1656 – De Saturni Luna Observatio Nova (About the new observation of the moon of Saturn), describes the discovery of Titan.
- 1656 – De Motu Corporum ex Percussione, published posthumously in 1703.
- 1657 – De Ratiociniis in Ludo Aleae (Van reeckening in spelen van geluck), translated into Latin by Frans van Schooten.
- 1659 – Systema Saturnium (System of Saturn).
- 1659 – De Vi Centrifuga (Concerning the centrifugal force), published posthumously in 1703.
- 1673 – Horologium Oscillatorium Sive de Motu Pendulorum ad Horologia Aptato Demonstrationes Geometricae, includes a theory of evolutes and designs of pendulum clocks, dedicated to Louis XIV of France.
- 1684 – Astroscopia Compendiaria Tubi Optici Molimine Liberata (Compound telescopes without a tube).
- 1685 – Memoriën aengaende het slijpen van glasen tot verrekijckers, dealing with the grinding of lenses.
- 1686 – Kort onderwijs aengaende het gebruijck der horologiën tot het vinden der lenghten van Oost en West (in Old Dutch), instructions on how to use clocks to establish the longitude at sea.
- 1690 – Traité de la Lumière, dealing with the nature of light propagation.
- 1690 – Discours de la Cause de la Pesanteur (Discourse about gravity), supplement.
- 1691 – Lettre Touchant le Cycle Harmonique, short tract concerning the 31-tone system.
- 1698 – Cosmotheoros, deals with the solar system, cosmology, and extraterrestrial life.
- 1703 – Opuscula Posthuma including:
  - De Motu Corporum ex Percussione (Concerning the motions of colliding bodies), contains the first correct laws for collision, dating from 1656.
  - Descriptio Automati Planetarii, provides a description and design of a planetarium.
- 1724 – Novus Cyclus Harmonicus, a treatise on music published in Leiden after Huygens's death.
- 1728 – Christiani Hugenii Zuilichemii, dum viveret Zelhemii Toparchae, Opuscula Posthuma (alternate title: Opera Reliqua), includes works in optics and physics.
- 1888–1950 – Huygens, Christiaan. Oeuvres complètes. Complete works, 22 volumes. Editors D. Bierens de Haan (1–5), J. Bosscha (6–10), D.J. Korteweg (11–15), A.A. Nijland (15), J.A. Vollgraf (16–22). The Hague:
  - Tome I: Correspondance 1638–1656 (1888).
  - Tome II: Correspondance 1657–1659 (1889).
  - Tome III: Correspondance 1660–1661 (1890).
  - Tome IV: Correspondance 1662–1663 (1891).
  - Tome V: Correspondance 1664–1665 (1893).
  - Tome VI: Correspondance 1666–1669 (1895).
  - Tome VII: Correspondance 1670–1675 (1897).
  - Tome VIII: Correspondance 1676–1684 (1899).
  - Tome IX: Correspondance 1685–1690 (1901).
  - Tome X: Correspondance 1691–1695 (1905).
  - Tome XI: Travaux mathématiques 1645–1651 (1908).
  - Tome XII: Travaux mathématiques pures 1652–1656 (1910).
  - Tome XIII, Fasc. I: Dioptrique 1653, 1666 (1916).
  - Tome XIII, Fasc. II: Dioptrique 1685–1692 (1916).
  - Tome XIV: Calcul des probabilités. Travaux de mathématiques pures 1655–1666 (1920).
  - Tome XV: Observations astronomiques. Système de Saturne. Travaux astronomiques 1658–1666 (1925).
  - Tome XVI: Mécanique jusqu’à 1666. Percussion. Question de l'existence et de la perceptibilité du mouvement absolu. Force centrifuge (1929).
  - Tome XVII: L’horloge à pendule de 1651 à 1666. Travaux divers de physique, de mécanique et de technique de 1650 à 1666. Traité des couronnes et des parhélies (1662 ou 1663) (1932).
  - Tome XVIII: L'horloge à pendule ou à balancier de 1666 à 1695. Anecdota (1934).
  - Tome XIX: Mécanique théorique et physique de 1666 à 1695. Huygens à l'Académie royale des sciences (1937).
  - Tome XX: Musique et mathématique. Musique. Mathématiques de 1666 à 1695 (1940).
  - Tome XXI: Cosmologie (1944).
  - Tome XXII: Supplément à la correspondance. Varia. Biographie de Chr. Huygens. Catalogue de la vente des livres de Chr. Huygens (1950).

== See also ==
=== Concepts ===
- Huygens–Steiner theorem
- Huygens's principle
- Huygens's lemniscate
- Evolute
- Centre of oscillation

=== People ===
- René Descartes
- Galileo Galilei
- Isaac Newton
- Gottfried Wilhelm Leibniz

=== Technology ===
- History of the internal combustion engine
- List of largest optical telescopes historically
- Fokker Organ
- Seconds pendulum
