= Repetition pitch =

Repetition pitch is an unexpected sensation of tonality or pitch that often occurs in nature when a sound is reflected against a sound-reflecting surface (for example: a brick wall), and both the original and the reflected sound arrive at the ear of an observer, but with a short time delay between the two arrivals.

== Pitch and delay time ==
When the delay of the repeated sound is too large, the observer perceives an echo; when the delay of the repeated sound is generally smaller than 30 ms, he perceives the original sound only, but with a tonality (coloration, pitch) superimposed. Therefore, this perceptual phenomenon has been named Repetition Pitch (RP). In general, the perceived RP (expressed in Hz-equivalent) is equal to the reciprocal value of the delay time (T) between the original and the repeated sound, or in formula: RP = 1/T (with T expressed in seconds). RP is most salient when the original sound is wide-band in frequency content and does not produce pitch itself (like white noise, which contains all audible frequencies in equal strength).

== Varied sources ==
Probably the first written report of the phenomenon dates from 1693 when Christiaan Huygens noted such a pitch in the (wide-band) sound from a fountain repeatedly reflected against the steps of a large stone staircase in the garden of the castle of Chantilly in France. In an open field, one might be able to hear a gliding RP when a plane flies over. In music, the phenomenon is sometimes deliberately created by electronic means (delay and add) to superimpose a pitch or coloration effect on the original music (see Flanging). In room acoustics and sound recording, however, the phenomenon often causes an unwanted coloration of the original sound. See Repetition Pitch for various sound demos.

== Uses and studies ==
Blind people might use RP to locate obstacles by clicking the street surface with their cane, thus producing a wide-band impulsive sound that is reflected against the obstacle. RP has been subject of various studies, both psychophysical, electrophysiological and behavioural.
