= Bernard Vaillant =

Dutch Golden Age painter

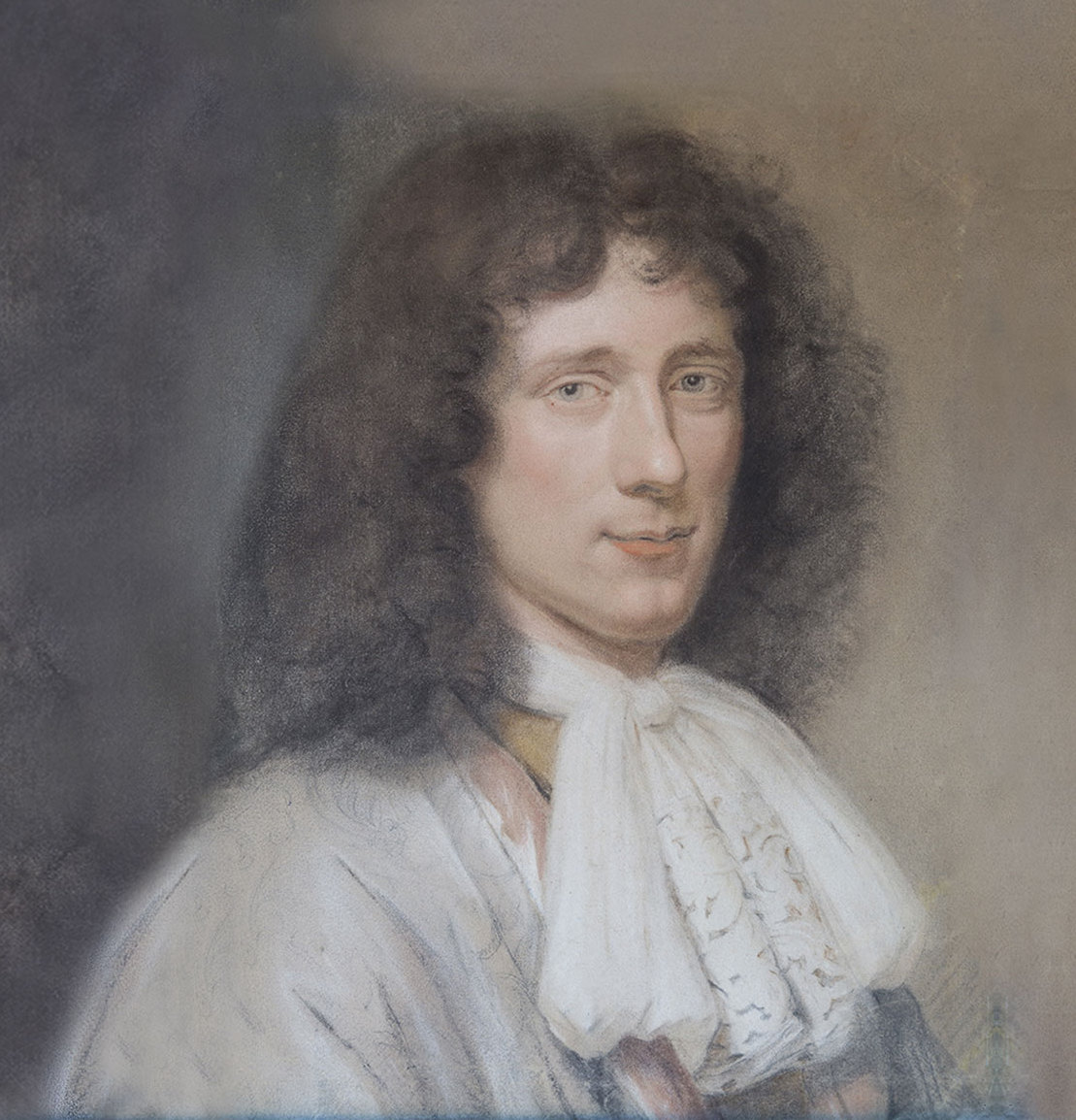
Pastel portrait of Christiaan Huygens, located in Hofwijck museum.

Bernard Vaillant (1632 in Lille – 1698 in Leiden), was a Dutch Golden Age painter.

According to Houbraken he accompanied his older brother Wallerant Vaillant on all of his travels. He moved to Rotterdam to become deacon of the Walloon church there, but died unexpectedly in Leiden.

According to the RKD he was the younger half-brother of the painter Wallerant Vaillant. In 1670 he became betrothed to Agneta Menton and lived on the Fluwelen Burgwal in Amsterdam. He is also registered as living in Paris and Rotterdam. He is known for engraved portraits, but also portraits in oils and pastels.
