= Problem of points =

Problem in probability theory

The problem of points, also called the problem of division of the stakes, is a classical problem in probability theory. One of the famous problems that motivated the beginnings of modern probability theory in the 17th century, it led Blaise Pascal to the first explicit reasoning about what today is known as an expected value.

The problem concerns a game of chance with two players who have equal chances of winning each round. The players contribute equally to a prize pot, and agree in advance that the first player to have won a certain number of rounds will collect the entire prize. Now suppose that the game is interrupted by external circumstances before either player has achieved victory. How does one then divide the pot fairly? It is tacitly understood that the division should depend somehow on the number of rounds won by each player, such that a player who is close to winning will get a larger part of the pot. But the problem is not merely one of calculation; it also involves deciding what a "fair" division actually is.

== History ==
=== Early solutions ===
Luca Pacioli considered such a problem in his 1494 textbook Summa de arithmetica, geometrica, proportioni et proportionalità. His method was to divide the stakes in proportion to the number of rounds won by each player, and the number of rounds needed to win did not enter his calculations at all.

In the mid-16th century Niccolò Tartaglia noticed that Pacioli's method leads to counterintuitive results if the game is interrupted when only one round has been played. In that case, Pacioli's rule would award the entire pot to the winner of that single round, though a one-round lead early in a long game is far from decisive. Tartaglia constructed a method that avoids that particular problem by basing the division on the ratio between the size of the lead and the length of the game. This solution is still not without problems, however; in a game to 100 it divides the stakes in the same way for a 65–55 lead as for a 99–89 lead, even though the former is still a relatively open game whereas in the latter situation victory for the leading player is almost certain. Tartaglia himself was unsure whether the problem was solvable at all in a way that would convince both players of its fairness: "in whatever way the division is made there will be cause for litigation".

=== Pascal and Fermat ===
The problem arose again around 1654 when the Chevalier de Méré, Antoine Gombaud posed it to Blaise Pascal. Pascal discussed the problem in his ongoing correspondence with Pierre de Fermat. Through this discussion, Pascal and Fermat not only provided a convincing, self-consistent solution to this problem, but also developed concepts that are still fundamental to probability theory.

The starting insight for Pascal and Fermat was that the division should not depend so much on the history of the part of the interrupted game that actually took place, as on the possible ways the game might have continued, were it not interrupted. It is intuitively clear that a player with a 7–5 lead in a game to 10 has the same chance of eventually winning as a player with a 17–15 lead in a game to 20, and Pascal and Fermat therefore thought that interruption in either of the two situations ought to lead to the same division of the stakes. In other words, what is important is not the number of rounds each player has won so far, but the number of rounds each player still needs to win in order to achieve overall victory.

Fermat now reasoned thus: If one player needs $r$ more rounds to win and the other needs $s$, the game will surely have been won by someone after $r+s-1$ additional rounds. Therefore, imagine that the players were to play $r+s-1$ more rounds; in total these rounds have $2^{r+s-1}$ different possible outcomes. In some of these possible futures the game will actually have been decided in fewer than $r+s-1$ rounds, but it does no harm to imagine the players continuing to play with no purpose. Considering only equally long futures has the advantage that one easily convinces oneself that each of the $2^{r+s-1}$ possibilities is equally likely. Fermat was thus able to compute the odds for each player to win, simply by writing down a table of all $2^{r+s-1}$ possible continuations and counting how many of them would lead to each player winning. Fermat now considered it obviously fair to divide the stakes in proportion to those odds.

Fermat's solution, certainly "correct" by today's standards, was improved by Pascal in two ways. First, Pascal produced a more elaborate argument why the resulting division should be considered fair. Second, he showed how to calculate the correct division more efficiently than Fermat's tabular method, which becomes completely impractical (without modern computers) if $r+s-1$ is more than about 10.

Instead of just considering the probability of winning the entire remaining game, Pascal devised a principle of smaller steps: Suppose that the players had been able to play just one more round before being interrupted, and that we already had decided how to fairly divide the stakes after that one more round (possibly because that round lets one of the players win). The imagined extra round may lead to one of two possible futures with different fair divisions of the stakes, but since the two players have even chances of winning the next round, they should split the difference between the two future divisions evenly. In this way knowledge of the fair solutions in games with fewer rounds remaining can be used to calculate fair solutions for games with more rounds remaining.

It is easier to convince oneself that this principle is fair than it is for Fermat's table of possible futures, which are doubly hypothetical because one must imagine that the game sometimes continues after having been won. Pascal's analysis here is one of the earliest examples of using expected values instead of odds when reasoning about probability. Shortly after, this idea would become a basis for the first systematic treatise on probability De Ratiociniis in Ludo Aleae in 1657, by Christiaan Huygens. Huygens discussed a variant of the problem of points now known as the gambler's ruin problem. Later the modern concept of probability grew out of the use of expectation values by Pascal and Huygens.

The direct application of Pascal's step-by-step rule is significantly quicker than Fermat's method when many rounds remain. However, Pascal was able to use it as a starting point for developing more advanced computational methods. Through clever manipulation of identities involving what is today known as Pascal's triangle (including several of the first explicit proofs by induction) Pascal finally showed that in a game where player a needs r points to win and player b needs s points to win, the correct division of the stakes between player a (left side) and b (right side) is (using modern notation):

$\sum_{k=0}^{s-1} \binom{r+s-1}{k} \mbox{ : } \sum_{k=s}^{r+s-1} \binom{r+s-1}{k}$ where the $\binom{r+s-1}{k}$ term represents the combination operator.

The problem of dividing the stakes became a major motivating example for Pascal in his 1665 Treatise on the arithmetic triangle.

Though Pascal's derivation of this result was independent of Fermat's tabular method, it is clear that it also describes exactly the counting of different outcomes of $r+s-1$ additional rounds that Fermat suggested.

== Alternative formulation ==
If one also wishes to know the time structure of playing the game to conclusion, a similar formula can be applied to determine the probability of each terminal hypothesis: that either a or b declares final victory on additional round n.

In the case of the game terminating after n additional rounds with a victorious, this entails that a prevails on round n, having also prevailed on $r-1$ out of the previous $n-1$ rounds, as readily expressed and calculated using Pascal's binomial form. If desired, terms pertaining to like outcomes can be summed to obtain Pascal's original result, taking account of distinct denominators $2^n$.

The solution obtained by abstracting the conclusion of the game to a constant number of future rounds, denoted as $r+s-1$, might have appealed more directly to the intuition of the day, but it is less informative, and not finally simpler, in algebraic terms, than summing over outcomes within the game's actual time structure.

== Further generality ==
Further generalizations, such as a and b having distinct and complementary probabilities of $p$ and $1-p$ to prevail at each round, follow this basic line of reasoning without difficulty, but go beyond the initial treatment of Pascal and Fermat, at conception. But what if $p$ is unknown? Laplace solved this problem using a Bayesian approach, assuming a uniform prior distribution for $p$.
