= Salomon Coster =

Dutch clockmaker

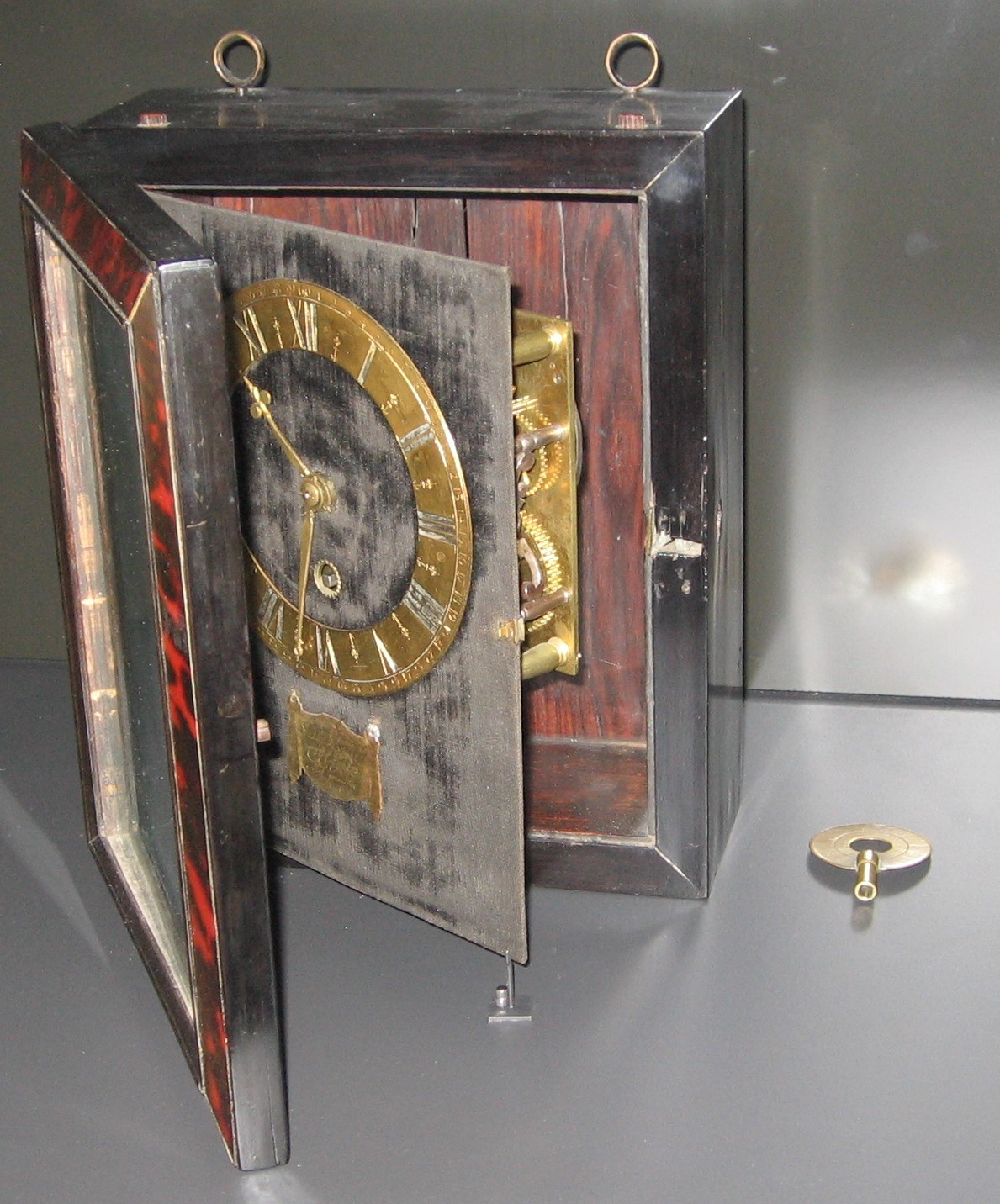
Original pendulum clock by S. Coster, after Huygens' design (1657).

Salomon Coster (c. 1620–1659) was a Dutch clockmaker of the Hague, who in 1657 was the first to make a pendulum clock, which had been invented by Dutch mathematician Christiaan Huygens (1629-1695). Coster died a sudden death in 1659.

Christiaan Huygens invented the pendulum in December 1656 and Salomon Coster received the patent to create the clocks a year later.

Coster's earliest pendulum clocks were signed "Samuel Coster - Haghe met privilege", indicating that he had been authorized by the inventor (Huygens) to make such clocks. This clock design was heralded as a new beginning in the clockmaking industry, due to its level of timekeeping accuracy which was previously unheard of. The oldest extant pendulum clock, signed by Coster in 1657, is on display at the Boerhaave Museum in Leiden, the Netherlands.

Around the same time, John Fromanteel, the son of a London clockmaker named Ahasuerus, went to work for Coster. He was one of many foreign clockmakers to soon make pendulum clocks following the prototype by Huygens and Coster. A contract was signed on 3 September 1657 between Salomon Coster and John Fromanteel which allowed Fromanteel to continue making the clocks.
