= Claude Mylon =

French mathematician

- Born: 1618; Paris, France
- Died: 1660 (aged 41–42); Paris, France

Claude Mylon (1618–1660) was a French mathematician and member of the Académie Parisienne and the Académie des Sciences.
