= Conical pendulum =

Weight suspended from a rope which swings in a circular or elliptical path

Monumental conical pendulum clock by Farcot, 1878

A conical pendulum consists of a weight (or bob) fixed on the end of a string or rod suspended from a pivot. Its construction is similar to an ordinary pendulum; however, instead of swinging back and forth along a circular arc, the bob of a conical pendulum moves at a constant speed in a circle or ellipse with the string (or rod) tracing out a cone. The conical pendulum was first studied by the English scientist Robert Hooke around 1660 as a model for the orbital motion of planets. In 1673 Dutch scientist Christiaan Huygens calculated its period, using his new concept of centrifugal force in his book Horologium Oscillatorium. Later it was used as the timekeeping element in a few mechanical clocks and other clockwork timing devices.

== Uses ==
During the 1800s, conical pendulums were used as the timekeeping element in a few clockwork timing mechanisms where a smooth motion was required, as opposed to the unavoidably jerky motion provided by ordinary pendulums. Two examples were mechanisms to turn the lenses of lighthouses to sweep their beams across the sea, and the location drives of equatorial mount telescopes, to allow the telescope to follow a star smoothly across the sky as the Earth turns.

One of the most important uses of the conical pendulum was in the flyball governor (centrifugal governor) invented by James Watt in 1788 which regulated the speed of steam engines during the Steam Age in the 1800s.

Some playground games, including totem tennis and tetherball, use a ball attached to a pole by a cord which functions as a conical pendulum, although in tetherball the pendulum gets shorter as the cord wraps around the pole. Some amusement park rides also act as conical pendulums.

== Analysis ==
Consider a conical pendulum consisting of a bob of mass m revolving without friction in a circle at a constant speed v on a string of length L at an angle of θ from the vertical.

There are two forces acting on the bob:

- the tension T in the string, which is exerted along the line of the string and acts toward the point of suspension.
- the downward bob weight mg, where m is the mass of the bob and g is the local gravitational acceleration.

The force exerted by the string can be resolved into a horizontal component, T sin(θ), toward the center of the circle, and a vertical component, T cos(θ), in the upward direction. From Newton's second law, the horizontal component of the tension in the string gives the bob a centripetal acceleration toward the center of the circle:

$$T \sin \theta =  \frac {mv^2}{r} \,$$

Conical pendulum whose bob travels in a horizontal circle of radius r. The bob has mass m and is suspended by a string of length L. The tension force of the string acting on the bob is the vector T, and the bob's weight is the vector mg.

Since there is no acceleration in the vertical direction, the vertical component of the tension in the string is equal and opposite to the weight of the bob:

$$T \cos \theta = mg \,$$

These two equations can be solved for T/m and equated, thereby eliminating T and m and yielding the centripetal acceleration:

$${g\tan\theta} = \frac {v^2} {r}$$

A little rearrangement gives:

$$\frac{g} {\cos\theta} = \frac {v^2} {r\sin \theta}$$

Since the speed of the pendulum bob is constant, it can be expressed as the circumference 2πr divided by the time t required for one revolution of the bob:

$$v = \frac {2\pi r}{t}$$

Substituting the right side of this equation for v in the previous equation, we find:

$$\frac {g} {\cos \theta}
= \frac {( \frac {2 \pi r} {t} )^2} {r \sin \theta}
= \frac {(2 \pi)^2 r} {t^2 \sin \theta}$$

Using the trigonometric identity tan(θ) = sin(θ) / cos(θ) and solving for t, the time required for the bob to travel one revolution is

$$t = 2 \pi \sqrt {\frac {r} {g \tan \theta}}$$

In a practical experiment, r varies and is not as easy to measure as the constant string length L. r can be eliminated from the equation by noting that r, h, and L form a right triangle, with θ being the angle between the leg h and the hypotenuse L (see diagram). Therefore,

$$r = L \sin \theta \,$$

Substituting this value for r yields a formula whose only varying parameter is the suspension angle θ:

$\, t = 2 \pi \sqrt { \frac {L \cos \theta} {g} }\,$

For small angles θ, cos(θ) ≈ 1; in which case

$$t  \approx 2 \pi \sqrt { \frac {L} {g} }$$

so that for small angles the period t of a conical pendulum is equal to the period of an ordinary pendulum of the same length. Also, the period for small angles is approximately independent of changes in the angle θ. This means the period of rotation is approximately independent of the force applied to keep it rotating. This property, called isochronism, is shared with ordinary pendulums and makes both types of pendulums useful for timekeeping.

== See also ==
- Newton's laws of motion
- Pendulum
- Pendulum (mechanics)
- Spherical pendulum
