= Doubochinski's pendulum =

Experiment

Doubochinski's pendulum is a classical oscillator interacting with a high-frequency field in such a way that the oscillator takes on a discrete set of stable regimes of oscillation, each at a frequency near to the proper frequency of the oscillator, but each with a distinct, "quantized" amplitude. The phenomenon of amplitude quantization in this sort of coupled system was first discovered by the brothers Danil and Yakov Doubochinski in 1968–69.

A simple demonstration apparatus consists of a mechanical pendulum interacting with a magnetic field. The system is composed of two interacting oscillatory processes: a pendulum arm with a natural frequency on the order of 0.5–1 Hz, with a small permanent magnet fixed at its moving end; and a stationary electromagnet (solenoid) positioned under the equilibrium point of the pendulum's trajectory and supplied with alternating current of fixed frequency, typically in the range of 10–1000 Hz.

The mechanical pendulum arm and solenoid are configured in such a way, that the pendulum arm interacts with the oscillating magnetic field of the solenoid only over a limited portion of its trajectory – the so-called "zone of interaction" – outside of which the strength of the magnetic field drops off rapidly to zero. This spatial inhomogeneity of the interaction is key to the discretized oscillation amplitudes and other unusual properties of the system.
