= List of weights =

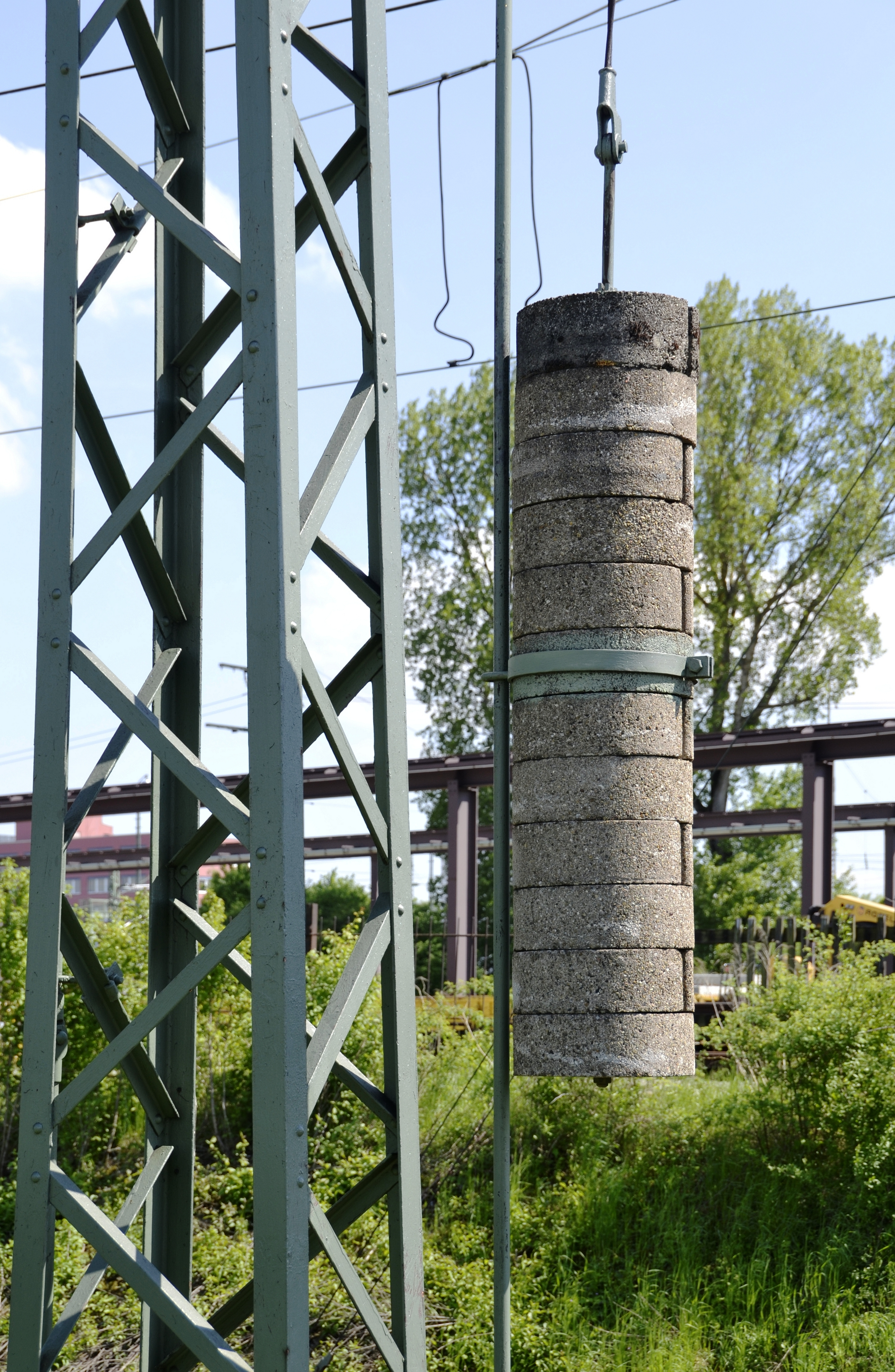
Hanging weight

A weight (also known as a mass) is an object, normally with high density, whose chief task is to have mass and exert weight (through gravity). It is used for different purposes, such as in:

- Anchor
- Balance weight
- Ballast
- Bob
- Counterweight
- Fishing sinker
- Paperweight
- Plumb bob
- Tuned mass damper
- Weight training equipment
