= Bob (physics) =

Weight on the end of a pendulum

A bob is a heavy object (also called a "weight" or "mass") on the end of a pendulum found most commonly, but not exclusively, in pendulum clocks.

== Reason for use ==
Although a pendulum can theoretically be any shape, any rigid object swinging on a pivot, clock pendulums are usually made of a weight or bob attached to the bottom end of a rod, with the top attached to a pivot so it can swing. The advantage of this construction is that it positions the centre of mass close to the physical end of the pendulum, farthest from the pivot. This maximizes the moment of inertia, and minimises the length of pendulum required for a given period. Shorter pendulums allow the clock case to be made smaller, and also minimize the pendulum's air resistance. Since most of the energy loss in clocks is due to air friction of the pendulum, this allows clocks to run longer on a given power source.

== Use in clocks ==
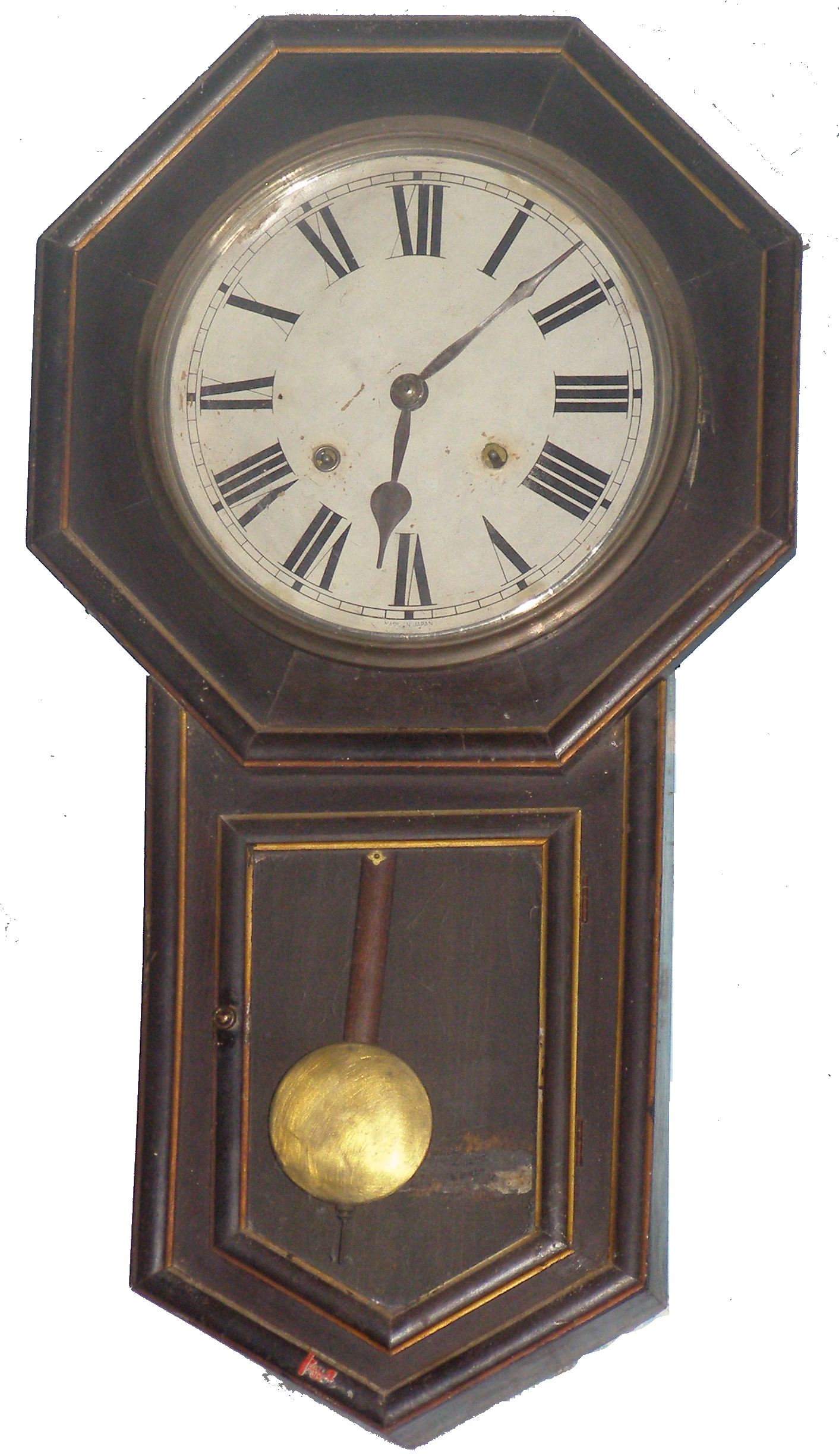
Pendulum clock with visible bob

Traditionally, a clock pendulum bob is a round flat disk, lens-shaped in section, to reduce its aerodynamic drag, but bobs in older clocks often have decorative carving and shapes characteristic of the type of clock. They are usually made of a dense metal such as iron or brass. Lead is denser, but is usually avoided because of its softness, which would result in the bob being dented during its inevitable collisions with the inside of the clock case when the clock is moved.

In most pendulum clocks the rate is adjusted by moving the bob up or down on the pendulum rod. Moving it up shortens the pendulum, making it beat more quickly, and causing the clock to gain time. In the most common arrangement, the bob is attached to the pendulum with an adjustment nut at the bottom, on the threaded end of the pendulum rod. Turning the nut adjusts the height of the bob. But some bobs have levers or dials to adjust the height. In some precision clocks there is a smaller auxiliary weight on a threaded shaft to allow more fine adjustment. Tower clocks sometimes have a tray mounted on the pendulum rod, to which small weights can be added or removed, to adjust the rate without stopping the clock.

The weight of the bob itself has little effect on the period of the pendulum. However, a heavier bob helps to keep the pendulum moving smoothly until it receives its next push from the clock's escapement mechanism. That increases the pendulum's Q factor, making the motion of the pendulum more independent of the escapement and the errors it introduces, leading to increased accuracy. On the other hand, the heavier the bob is the more energy must be supplied by the clock's power source and more friction and wear occurs in the clock's movement. Pendulum bobs in quality clocks are usually made as heavy as the clock's movement can drive. A common weight for the bob of a one second pendulum, widely used in grandfather clocks and many others, is around 2 kilograms.

== See also ==
- Plumb-bob
