= Harmonic motion =

Harmonic motion can mean: the displacement of the particle executing oscillatory motion that can be expressed in terms of sine or cosine functions known as harmonic motion.

- The motion of a Harmonic oscillator (in physics), which can be:
  - Simple harmonic motion
  - Complex harmonic motion
- Keplers laws of planetary motion (in physics, known as the harmonic law)
- Quasi-harmonic motion
- Musica universalis (in medieval astronomy, the music of the spheres)
- Chord progression (in music, harmonic progression)

== See also ==
- Pendulum
- Harmonograph
- Circular motion
