= Ivan Moscovich =

Yugoslav-Hungarian inventor (1926–2023)

- Born: 14 June 1926; Novi Sad, Kingdom of Serbs, Croats and Slovenes
- Died: 21 April 2023 (aged 96)
- Occupations: Inventor and commercial developer of puzzles, games, toys, and educational aids.

Ivan Moscovich (14 June 1926 – 21 April 2023) was a Yugoslav-Hungarian inventor, designer and commercial developer of puzzles, games, toys, and educational aids. He wrote many books and was internationally recognized in the toy industry as an innovative inventor.

== Biography ==
=== Early life ===
Ivan Moscovich was born to Jewish Hungarian parents on 14 June 1926 in Novi Sad in the Yugoslav province of Vojvodina and had a sheltered, middle class childhood. His father, a professional painter, escaped into Yugoslavia after World War I and opened a photographic studio there which he named Photo Ivan after his son.

=== World War II and Nazi concentration camp prisoner ===
In 1941, Yugoslavia surrendered unconditionally to the Axis powers during World War II. Hungary occupied Vojvodina. In January 1942, Moscovich's 44 year old father was a victim of the Novi Sad massacre. In 1943, Hungary started secret armistice negotiations with the Allied Powers which was discovered by Germany resulting in the German occupation of Vojvodina. Soon after, at the age of 17, Moscovich was taken to the concentration camp at Auschwitz with his grandfather, grandmother, and mother. His grandparents were immediately taken to the crematoria and were killed. While his mother remained imprisoned at Auschwitz, Moscovich was sent to Wustegiersdorf, one of the surrounding work camps, and put to work laying rail lines.

In January 1945, Auschwitz was evacuated and Moscovich along with 60,000 prisoners marched west to Bergen-Belsen. After only a few days, Moscovich volunteered for a selection of 500 volunteer prisoner workers. These volunteers were sent to clear the railway station in Hildesheim by dislodging the wagons to free the rails so they could be fixed and used for German transports. While there, several groups found food supplies including sugar, butter, and eggs. On 22 March Hildesheim was bombed, killing or wounding both prisoners and German guards. The volunteers were made to move the bodies for easier identification.

They were then marched to the Hannover-Ahlem prison camp. The prisoners worked in an asbestos mine converting it into an ammunition depot safe from aerial attacks. Hannover-Ahlem was evacuated on 6 April 1945 and Moscovich marched towards Bergen-Belsen again. Moscovich described the last days in Bergen-Belsen as “the ultimate in human misery, suffering, degradation, death and humiliation”. He hid himself among a pile of dead bodies to avoid the Germans.

British soldiers liberated Bergen-Belsen on 15 April 1945. Moscovich, who had endured four concentration camps and two forced work camps, was sent to Sweden for recuperation, and while there he was reunited with his mother who had been liberated from Mauthausen by American troops.

=== Life after World War II (1945–1952) ===
Moscovich got his first job in Yugoslavia when a friend in Tito’s Ministry of Transport offered him a position repairing Yugoslavia’s railway system which had been damaged during the war. The job required a large, untested German machine using high electrical wattage to weld rail lines. By 1947, Moscovich reported directly to the deputy minister.

Moscovich was given control over a squad of 50 German prisoners of war including some high ranking German officers, some regular soldiers, some Wehrmacht, and some SS. Although he considered taking his revenge, Moscovich elected to increase their rations in order to increase their productivity. However, he never told them he was a camp survivor. After six months, Joseph Tito released the workers.

During the time he worked the position, he received a medal from Tito himself.

=== Later years ===
After finishing his university studies in mechanical engineering at the University of Belgrade, Moscovich emigrated to Israel, where he initially worked as a research scientist involved in the design of teaching materials, educational aids, and educational games.

Moscovich died on 21 April 2023, at the age of 96.

== Artist ==
Moscovich created harmonographs: coloured swirls made by pens driven by an analogue computer. The machine could generate endless unique designs. The ossillations made by the machine are known by mathematicians as Lissajous figures. The first display of these works in London in1968 under the name "Cybernetic Serendipity" represented a milestone in Moscovich's artistic career.

Moscovich's kinetic art and other art creations have been shown in major art exhibitions at the Institute of Contemporary Arts, the International International Design Centrum in Berlin, and the Museo de Arte Moderno in Mexico City. He patented his harmonograph drawing device in 1967, and had a show of harmonographic art at the National Museum of Mathematics (MoMath) in New York City on 21 October 2021. Art and antiques dealer Henry Saywell presented an exhibition of his works at The Hospital club in Covent Garden in 2016, the preview of which was attended by Moscovich. In 2019, the Museum of Tolerance featured a retrospective of his work.

== Publications ==
- The Little Book of Big Brain Games. New York: Workman Publishing. 2010. ISBN 9780761161738.
- The Monty Hall Problem and Other Puzzles. Mineola, New York: Dover Publications. 2011. ISBN 9780486482408.
- Leonardo's Mirror and Other Puzzles. Mineola, New York: Dover Publications. January 2011. ISBN 9780486482392.
- The Puzzle Universe: A History of Mathematics in 315 Puzzles. Richmond Hill, Ontario, Canada: Firefly Books. 22 October 2015. ISBN 978-1770854758.
- The Puzzleman - the riddle man. New York: Wehrhahn Verlag. 2018. ISBN 9783865258083.
