= Lissajous =

Lissajous may refer to

- Jules Antoine Lissajous (1822–1880), French mathematician
  - Lissajous curve (or figure, or spiral), a mathematical figure showing a type of harmonic motion
  - Lissajous knot, in knot theory
  - Lissajous orbit, an orbital trajectory resembling a Lissajous curve
