= Esthesioneuroblastoma =

- Other names: Neuroblastoma
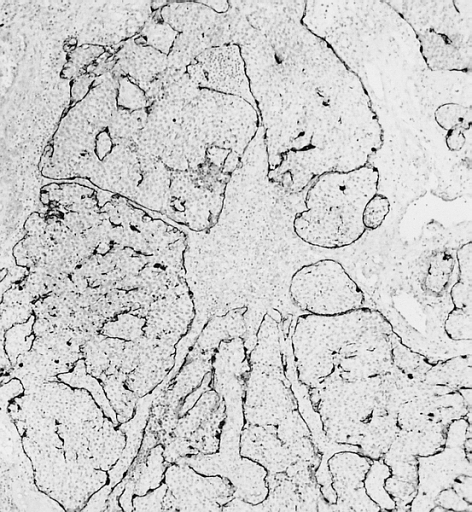
- Esthesioneuroblastoma
- Specialty: Neuro-oncology

Esthesioneuroblastoma is a rare cancer of the nasal cavity. Arising from the upper nasal tract, esthesioneuroblastoma is believed to originate from sensory neuroepithelial cells, also known as neuroectodermal olfactory cells.

Due to the location of the tumor and its proximity to the cranial cavity, esthesioneuroblastoma can be highly invasive and challenging to treat. There is no consensus on an appropriate treatment approach of esthesioneuroblastoma because of the rarity of the disease. Most studies reported cranial surgical resection with radiotherapy or chemotherapy to target the tumor.

== Signs and symptoms ==
Esthesioneuroblastoma frequently first presents as a nasal mass. The most common signs and symptoms of esthesioneuroblastoma are nasal obstruction (70%) and epistaxis (50%). Less common symptoms include hyposmia (loss of smell), headache, rhinorrhea, vision loss, proptosis, facial pain, diplopia (double vision), masses in the neck and changes in mental status. Esthesioneuroblastoma occurs in the upper nasal cavity, near the optic nerves and optic chiasm. Thus, tumor growth can impinge nerve function and result in vision loss and diplopia. As the tumor metastasizes to the oral cavity, there can be tooth pain and tooth mobility.

== Genetics ==
There is limited research on the genetic role in esthesioneuroblastoma development. Of the research to date, the sonic hedgehog pathway, MYC and KDR genes are implicated for esthesioneuroblastoma.

Mutations in dystrophin and Laminin, alpha 2 (LAMA2) have also been implicated in this disease.

== Pathophysiology ==
Esthesioneuroblastoma is of neurocrest origin, arising from olfactory sensory cells in the olfactory epithelium. The olfactory epithelium consists of olfactory sensory cells, sustentacular cells and basal cells. Esthesioneuroblastoma consists of lobular sheets with neurofibrilar fibers and rosettes. Hyam's classifications are an important way of determining prognosis.

Hyam's histopathological grades for esthesioneuroblastoma

| Grade | Lobular architexture preservation | Mitotic index | Nuclear polymorphism | Fibrillary matrix | Rosettes | Necrosis |
|---|---|---|---|---|---|---|
| I | + | none | none | prominent | Homer Wright (HW) rosettes | none |
| II | + | low | moderate | present | HW rosettes | none |
| III | +/- | moderate | prominent | low | Flexner-Wintersteiner rosettes | rare |
| IV | +/- | high | marked | absent | none | frequent |

== Diagnosis ==
Esthesioneuroblastoma can resemble small blue cell tumors like squamous cell carcinoma, sinonasal undifferentiated carcinoma, extranodal NK/T cell lymphoma, nasal type, rhabdomyosarcoma, Ewing/PNET, mucosal melanoma and neuroendocrine carcinomas (NEC) that occur in the intranasal tract. Compared to other tumors in the region, esthesioneuroblastoma has the best prognosis, with an overall five-year survival rate of 60–80%. Fewer than 700 cases have been documented in the United States alone. Esthesioneuroblastoma is characterized by neurofibrillary stroma and neurosecretary granules that are not seen concurrently by any other pathologies in the region. Histological tests such as keratin, CK5/6, S-100 protein or NSE can be run to further differentiate esthesioneuroblastoma from other tumors.

=== Staging ===
The Kadish classification is used for clinical classification of sinonasal tumors including esthesioneuroblastoma. Subsequent research articles have been published to determine prognosis based on tumor grade.

Modified Kadish classification

| Stage | Description | 5 year survival |
|---|---|---|
| A | Tumor confined to nasal cavity | 75–91 |
| B | Nasal cavity and paranasal sinuses | 68–71 |
| C | Tumor extends beyond nasal cavity and paranasal sinuses, including skull base, orbit or cribiform plate | 41–47 |
| D | Tumor metastasizes to cervical lymph nodes and beyond | <40 |

Dulguerov classification

| Stage | Characteristics |
|---|---|
| T1 | Tumour involving the nasal cavity and/or paranasal sinuses (excluding sphenoid), sparing the most superior ethmoidal cells |
| T2 | Tumour involving the nasal cavity and/or paranasal sinuses (including the sphenoid) with extension to or erosion of the cribriform plate |
| T3 | Tumour extending into the orbit or protruding into the anterior cranial fossa, without dural invasion |
| T4 | Tumour involving the brain |
| N0 | No cervical lymph-node metastasis |
| N1 | Any form of cervical lymph-node metastasis |
| M0 | No metastases |
| M1 | Distant metastasis |

== Treatment ==
The preferred treatment for esthesioneuroblastoma is surgery followed by radiotherapy to prevent recurrence of the tumor.

=== Surgical approaches ===
Several surgical approaches have been described, but post-excision recurrence rates have remained relatively high. Studies suggest better results with a bilateral approach. For cases with cribriform plate involvement, tumors are resected bilaterally using a transfacial and craniotomy approach. In a research study, the craniofacial approach decreased recurrence of esthesioneuroblastoma by 20%. Craniofacial resection can help preserve the optic nerves and brain while removing the cribriform plate, olfactory bulb, dura surrounding the bulb and even the orbital periosteum.

=== Radiotherapy ===
Radiotherapy alone is reserved only for small lesions not appropriate for either surgery or chemotherapy. Both photon and proton radiotherapy have been used effectively to treat esthesioneuroblastoma. Proton radiotherapy has recently been shown to be effective in a 10-person study with Kadish C tumors, while delivering less toxicity to the nervous system.

=== Chemotherapy ===
Chemotherapy is used in a multimodality treatment plan generally for more advanced, unresectable or reoccurring tumors. Cyclophosphamide, vincristine and doxorubicin have been used as neoadjuvant chemotherapy drugs for grade C esthesioneuroblastoma before surgical resection, producing fair outcomes. Cisplatin and etoposide are often used to treat esthesioneuroblastoma as neoadjuvants or adjuvants with radiotherapy or surgery.

Study results are promising. In advanced stage esthesioneuroblastoma in pediatric patients, where surgery is no longer possible, aggressive chemotherapy and radiotherapy has resulted in some tumor control and long-term survival.

== Prognosis ==
Esthesioneuroblastoma is a slow developing but malignant tumor with high recurrence rates because of its anatomical position. The tumor composition, location and metastatic characteristics as well as the treatment plan determine prognosis. Common clinical classification systems for esthesioneuroblastoma include the Kadish classification and the Dulguerov classification. Histopathological characteristics on top of Kadish classification can further determine cancer prognosis. In severe, Kadish class C tumors, Haym's grades of pathology are important for prognosis. Patients with low grade Kadish class C tumors have a 10-year survival rate of 86 percent compared to patients with high grade class C tumors who have a survival rate of 28 percent. Surgically treated patients with high grade tumors are more likely to experience leptomeningeal metastases or involvement of the cerebral spinal fluid unlike patients with low grade tumors who usually only see local recurrence.

Survival rates for treated esthesioneuroblastoma are best for surgery with radiotherapy (65%), then for radiotherapy and chemotherapy (51%), just surgery (48%), surgery, radiotherapy and chemotherapy (47%) and finally just radiotherapy (37%). From the literature, radiotherapy and surgery seem to boast the best outcome for patients. However, it is important to understand that to some degree, prognosis is related to tumor severity. More progressed, higher grade tumors would result in chemotherapy or radiotherapy as the only treatment. It is no surprise that the prognosis would be worse in these cases.

== Incidence ==
Esthesioneuroblastoma accounts for 2% of all intranasal tumors with an incidence of 0.4 cases per million people. Fewer than 700 cases have been documented in the United States. Fewer than 400 unique cases have been reported globally. Esthesioneuroblastoma can occur at any time, with peak occurrence reported in the second and sixth decades of life.

== History ==
Esthesioneuroblastoma was first characterized in 1924.

== Notable cases ==
The disease was brought into prominence by the case of Chantal Sébire, who was suffering from the disease and ended her life after being denied euthanasia.
