= Jules Antoine Lissajous =

French physicist

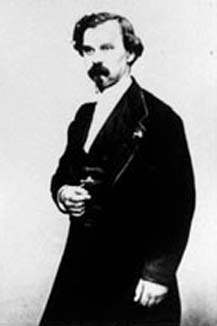
- Jules Antoine Lissajous, date and photographer unknown
- Born: 4 March 1822; Versailles, France
- Died: 24 June 1880 (aged 58); Plombières-les-Dijon, France
- Known for: Lissajous figures
- Scientific career
- Fields: Physics
- Thesis: Sur la position des noeuds dans les lames qui vibrent transversalement (1850)

Jules Antoine Lissajous (French pronunciation: [ʒyl ɑ̃twan lisaʒu]; 4 March 1822 in Versailles – 24 June 1880 in Plombières-les-Dijon) was a French physicist, after whom Lissajous figures are named. Among other innovations, Lissajous invented the Lissajous apparatus, a device that creates the figures that bear his name. In it, a beam of light is bounced off a mirror attached to a vibrating tuning fork, and then reflected off a second mirror attached to a perpendicularly oriented vibrating tuning fork (usually of a different pitch, creating a specific harmonic interval), onto a wall, resulting in a Lissajous figure. This led to the invention of other apparatus such as the harmonograph.

== See also ==
- Lissajous curve
- Lissajous orbit
