= Chantal Sébire =

French teacher

- Born: 28 January 1955
- Died: 19 March 2008 (aged 53); Plombières-lès-Dijon, France

Chantal Sébire (28 January 1955 – 19 March 2008) was a French teacher who suffered from esthesioneuroblastoma, a rare form of cancer, and fought for the right to die through euthanasia.

== Background ==
Chantal lived in Plombières-lès-Dijon, near Dijon, France, and was the mother of three children. In 2000, she was diagnosed with esthesioneuroblastoma, a rare form of cancer that affects the inside lining of the nose.

Chantal refused any treatment at the time of her diagnosis, not wishing to take the risk of the surgery or medications, stating "drugs are chemicals, chemicals are poison, and I won't make matters worse by poisoning myself."

With time, the cancer burrowed through her sinuses, nasal cavities, and eye socket, leaving her face severely disfigured. She also lost her senses of sight, taste, and smell and suffered severe pain. During the course of the disease she had developed an allergy against morphine and treated the pain with aspirin.

Chantal first gained recognition in February 2008, after a TV interview, when she made a public appeal to the French president, Nicolas Sarkozy, to allow her to die through euthanasia, stating that "One would not allow an animal to go through what I have endured." On 17 March 2008, she lost her case in a French court, with the magistrate noting that while French law does allow for the removal of life-support equipment for terminally ill patients, it does not allow a doctor to take action to end a patient's life. After the decision, Chantal said "I now know how to get my hands on what I need, and if I don't get it in France, I will get it elsewhere".

Two days later, on 19 March 2008, she was found dead in her home. An autopsy conducted on 21 March 2008 concluded that she did not die of natural causes. Subsequent blood tests revealed a toxic concentration of the drug pentobarbital, a barbiturate that is not available in French pharmacies but is used elsewhere in the world for the purpose of physician assisted suicide.

Chantal's death revived the debate over euthanasia in France and elsewhere around the world.

Several samples stored in the hospital of Dijon went missing. The prosecution closed the case in March 2009, as the source of the barbiturate used for the suicide could not be determined.

== See also ==
- Diane Pretty
