= Complex harmonic motion =

Complicated realm of physics based on simple harmonic motion

In physics, complex harmonic motion is a complicated realm based on the simple harmonic motion. The word "complex" refers to different situations. Unlike simple harmonic motion, which is regardless of air resistance, friction, etc., complex harmonic motion often has additional forces to dissipate the initial energy and lessen the speed and amplitude of an oscillation until the energy of the system is totally drained and the system comes to rest at its equilibrium point.

== Types ==
=== Damped harmonic motion ===
==== Introduction ====
Analysis of damped oscillatory forces in swimming

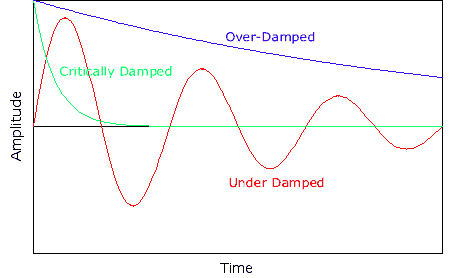
A diagram of three types of damped harmonic motion

Damped harmonic motion is a real oscillation, in which an object is hanging on a spring. Because of the existence of internal friction and air resistance, the system will over time experience a decrease in amplitude. The decrease of amplitude is due to the fact that the energy goes into thermal energy.

Damped harmonic motion happens because the spring is not very efficient at storing and releasing energy so that the energy dies out. The damping force is proportional to the velocity of the object and is at the opposite direction of the motion so that the object slows down quickly. Specifically, when an object is damping, the damping force $F$ will be related to velocity $v$ by a coefficient $c$:

$$F=-cv.$$

The diagram shown on the right indicates three types of damped harmonic motion.

- Critically damped: The system returns to equilibrium as quickly as possible without oscillating.
- Underdamped: The system oscillates (at reduced frequency compared to the undamped case) with the amplitude gradually decreasing to zero.
- Overdamped: The system returns (exponentially decays) to equilibrium without oscillating.

==== Difference between damped and forced oscillation ====
An object or a system is oscillating in its own natural frequency without the interference of an external periodic force or initial motion. Damped oscillation is similar to forced oscillation except that it has continuous and repeated force. Hence, these are two motions that have opposite results.

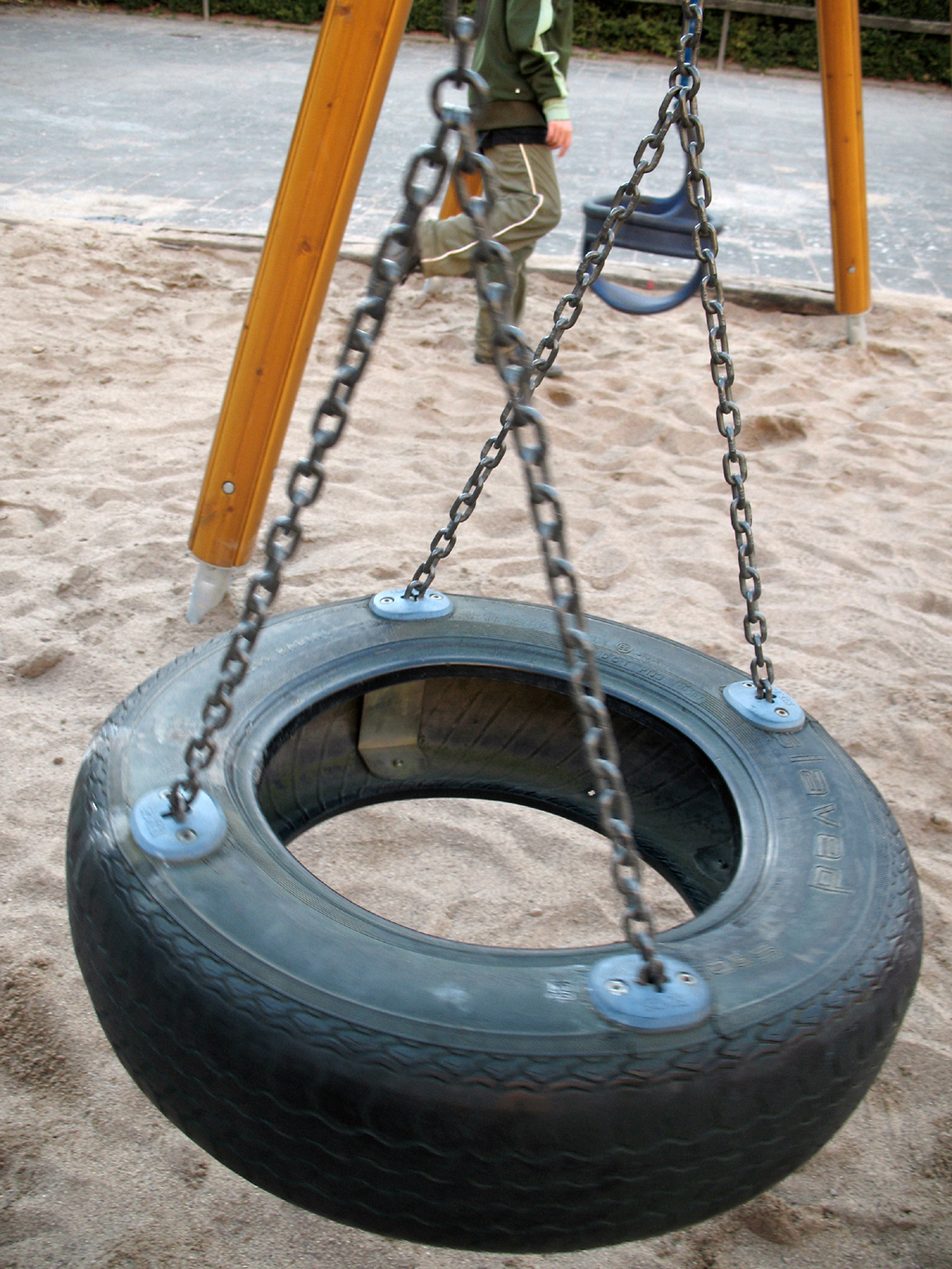
A playground swing

==== Examples ====
1. Bungee jumper provides a large force of bouncing by compressing the springs underneath it. The compression theoretically turns the kinetic energy into elastic potential energy. When the elastic potential energy reaches its top boundary, it can be exerted onto the object or child that presses on it within the form of kinetic energy.
2. Rubber band works the same as the spring.

=== Resonance ===
Resonant frequency amplitude

==== Introduction ====
Resonance occurs when the frequency of the external force (applied) is the same as the natural frequency (resonant frequency) of the system. When such a situation occurs, the external force always acts in the same direction as the motion of the oscillating object, with the result that the amplitude of the oscillation increases indefinitely, as it's shown in the adjacent diagram. Away from the value of resonant frequency, either greater or lesser, the amplitude of the corresponding frequency is smaller.

In a set of driving pendulums with different length of strings hanging objects, the one pendulum with the same length of string as the driver gets the biggest amplitude of swinging.

==== Examples ====
- Parts of a car may vibrate if you drive over a bumpy road at a speed where the vibrations transmitted to the body are at the resonant frequency of that part (though most cars are designed with parts with natural frequencies that are not likely to be produced by driving).
- Bass frequencies from stereo speakers can make a room resonate, particularly annoying if you live next door and your living room resonates due to your neighbour's music.
- A man walks across a field carrying a long plank on his shoulder. At each step the plank flexes a little (a) and the ends move up and down. He then starts to trot and as a result bounces up and down (b). At one particular speed resonance will occur between the motion of the man and the plank and the ends of the plank then oscillate with large amplitude.
- When using a microwave oven to cook food, the micro wave travels through the food, causing the water molecules vibrate in the same frequency, which is similar to resonance, so that the food as a whole, gets hot fast.
- Some of the helicopter crashes are caused by resonance too. The eyeballs of the pilot resonate because of excessive pressure in the upper air, making the pilot unable to see overhead power lines. As a result, the helicopter is out of control.
- Resonance of two identical tuning forks.
- Mircrowave ovens use resonance to vibrate polar molecules which collide and manifest their energy transfer as heat.

See video: https://www.youtube.com/watch?v=aCocQa2Bcuc

=== Double pendulum ===
==== Introduction ====
Double pendulum

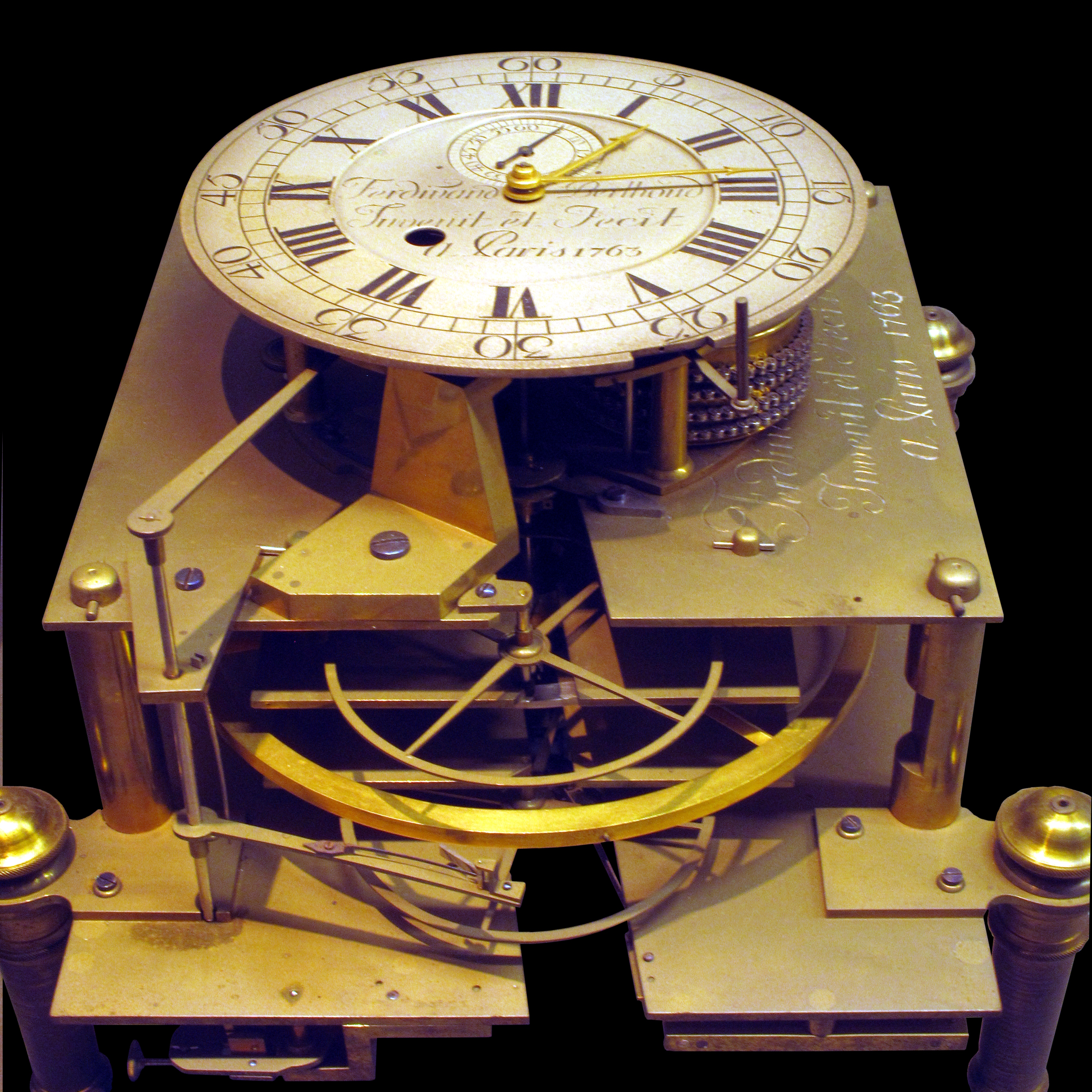
Ferdinand Berthoud marine clock No2 with motor spring and double pendulum sheel 1763

A double pendulum is a simple pendulum hanging under another one; the epitome of the compound pendulum system. It shows abundant dynamic behavior. The motion of a double pendulum seems chaotic. We can hardly see a regulated routine that it is following, making it complicated. Varying lengths and masses of the two arms can make it hard to identify the centers of the two rods. Moreover, a double pendulum may exert motion without the restriction of only a two-dimensional (usually vertical) plane. In other words, the complex pendulum can move to anywhere within the sphere, which has the radius of the total length of the two pendulums. However, for a small angle, the double pendulum can act similarly to the simple pendulum because the motion is determined by sine and cosine functions as well.

==== Examples ====
The image shows a marine clock with motor springs and double pendulum sheel.

== See also ==
- Cymatics
- Lissajous curve
- Double pendulum
- Resonance
