= Plombières-lès-Dijon =

- Commune
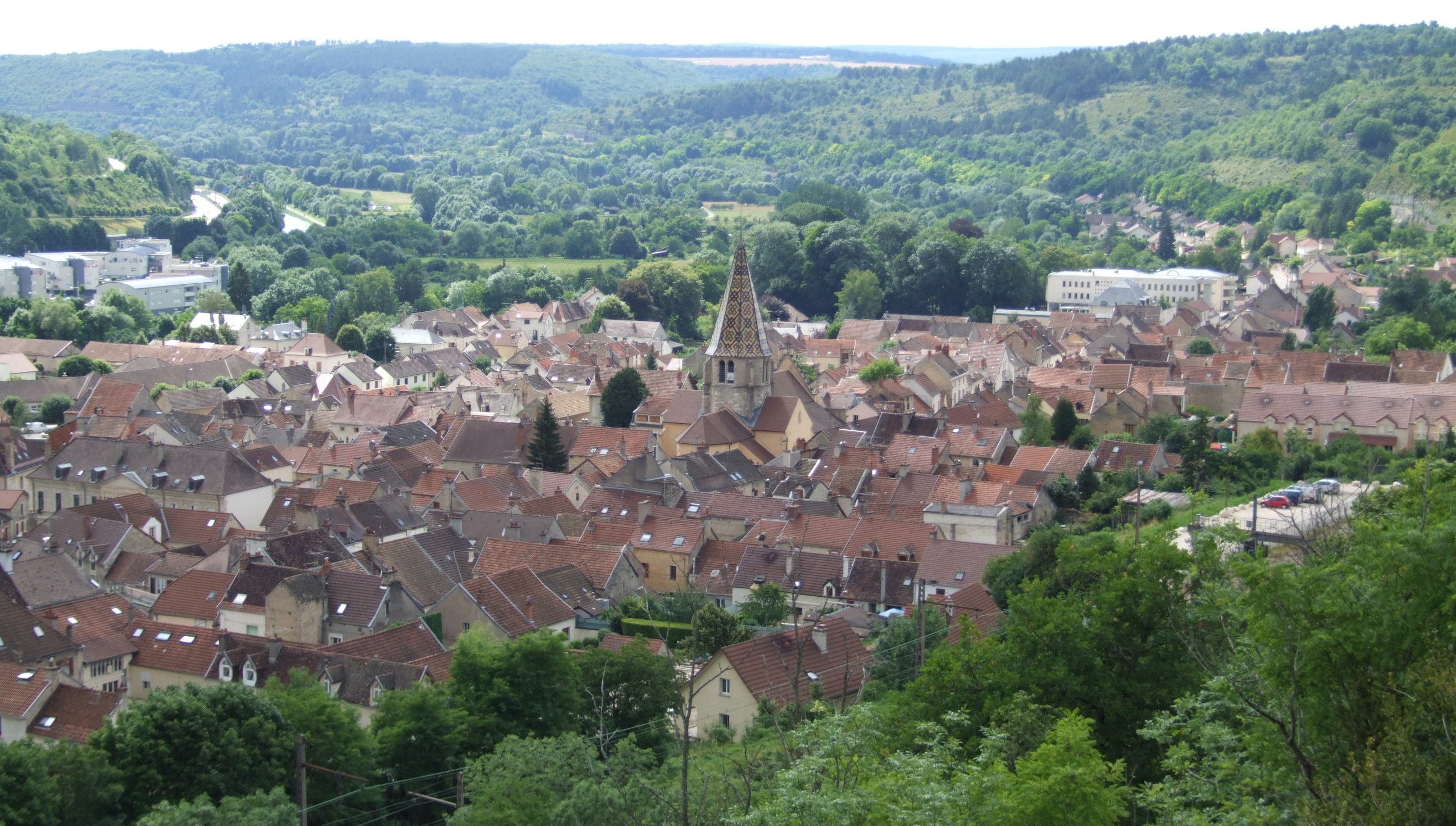
- A general view of Plombières-lès-Dijon

- Coat of arms
- Location of Plombières-lès-Dijon
- Location within France Location within Bourgogne-Franche-Comté
- Coordinates: 47°20′25″N 4°58′23″E
- Country: France
- Region: Bourgogne-Franche-Comté
- Department: Côte-d'Or
- Arrondissement: Dijon
- Canton: Talant
- Intercommunality: Dijon Métropole

Government
  - Mayor (2020–2026): Monique Bayard
- Area^{1}: 16.21 km^{2} (6.26 sq mi)
- Elevation: 270 m (890 ft)
- Highest elevation: 450 m (1,480 ft)
- Lowest elevation: 241 m (791 ft)
- Population (2023): 2,497
  - Density: 154.0/km^{2} (399.0/sq mi)
- Time zone: UTC+01:00 (CET)
  - Summer (DST): UTC+02:00 (CEST)
- INSEE/Postal code: 21485 /21370
- ^{1} French Land Register data, which excludes lakes, ponds, glaciers > 1 km^{2} (0.386 sq mi or 247 acres) and river estuaries.

Plombières-lès-Dijon (French pronunciation: [plɔ̃bjɛʁ lɛ diʒɔ̃], literally Plombières near Dijon) is a commune in the Côte-d'Or department in eastern France.

== Population ==
Historical population
Year	Pop.	±% p.a.
1968	2,178	—
1975	2,064	−0.77%
1982	1,820	−1.78%
1990	2,123	+1.94%
1999	2,491	+1.79%
2007	2,855	+1.72%
2012	2,731	−0.88%
2017	2,556	−1.32%
2023	2,497	−0.39%
Source: INSEE

== Personalities ==
- Chantal Sébire, teacher and euthanasia activist
- Paillet, Julien (de Plombières), 1771-? (probably, cf. titles of his works, etc., at the Bibliothèque nationale de France)

== See also ==
- Communes of the Côte-d'Or department
