= Sinonasal undifferentiated carcinoma =

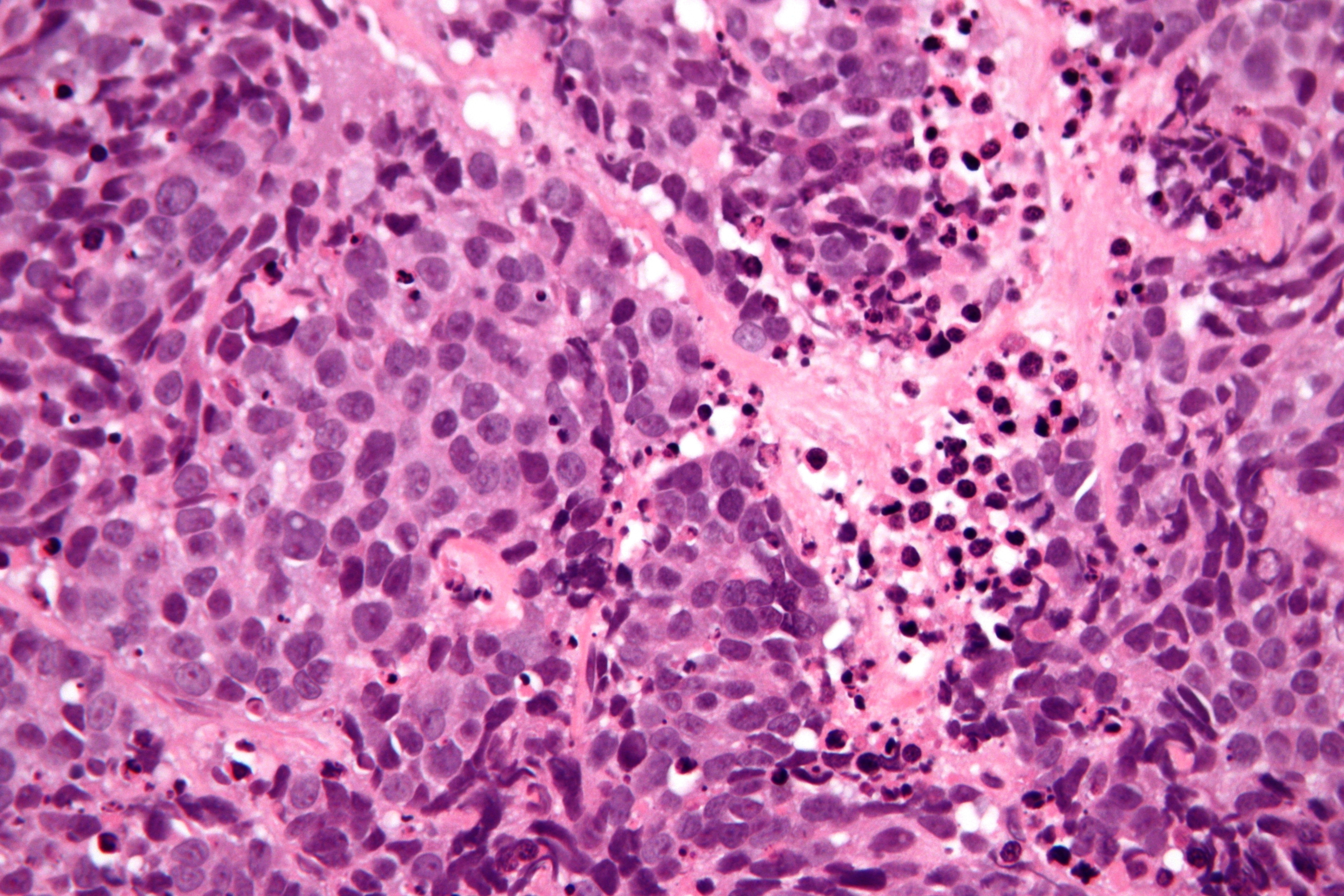
- Micrograph of a sinonasal undifferentiated carcinoma. H&E stain.
- Specialty: ENT surgery

Sinonasal undifferentiated carcinoma is a rare aggressive type of cancer that arises from epithelium or lining of the nose or sinuses.

== Signs and symptoms ==
In most cases, symptoms present themselves at an advanced stage of disease. They can include but are not limited to:

- Nosebleed
- Nasal obstruction
- Proptosis (displacement of the eye)
- Vision changes
- Headache

== Pathology ==
The underlying mechanism is unknown, however, Gelbard et al. studied 12 oncogenes or known tumor suppressor gene “hotspots” where mutations in these regions are known to cause other types of neurocarcinomas. They also studied single nucleotide polymorphisms located in vascular endothelial growth factor in order to find sites for finely targeted therapeutics.

Spectroscopy-based research done in this study identified 95 common mutations within the 12 hotspots. Of the 95 single nucleotide polymorphisms, none presented a genotype that was an activating mutation.

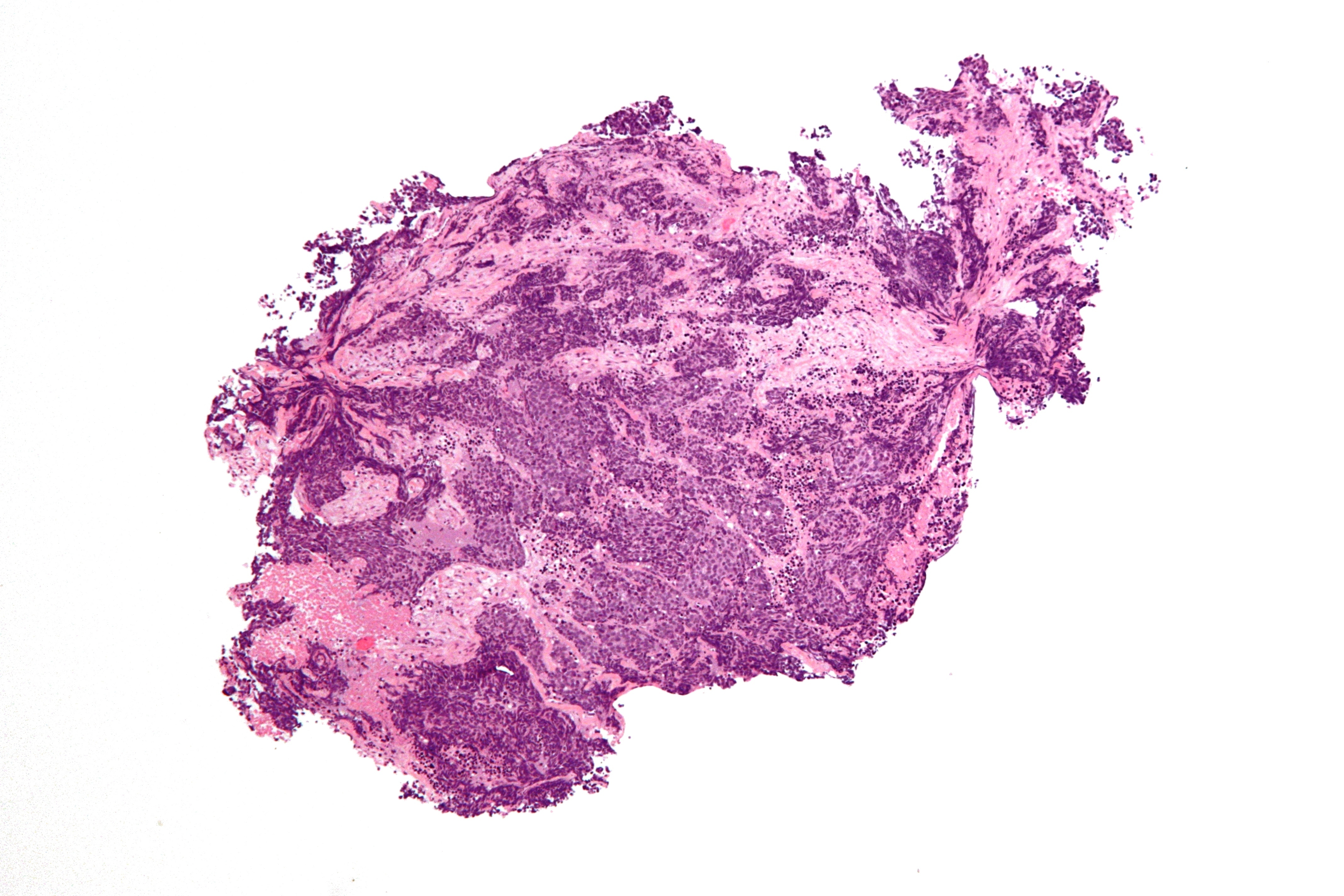
Low mag.

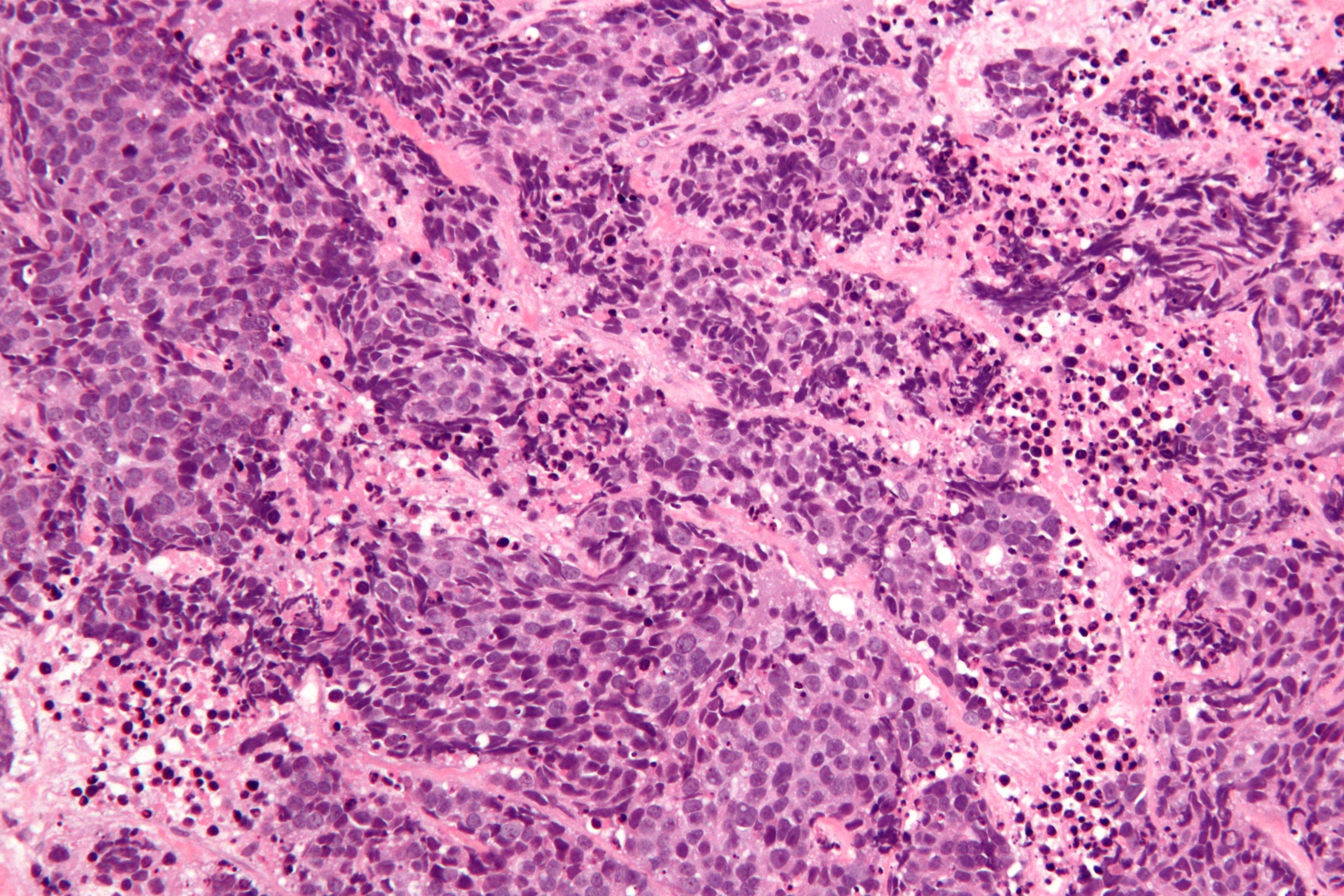
High mag.

== Diagnosis ==
Sinonasal undifferentiated carcinoma is a rare and aggressive type of cancer originating in the epithelial layer of the nasal cavity or paranasal sinuses. It was first diagnosed in 1987.

The aggressive nature of the cancer coupled with the advanced stage of disease upon presentation lead to a poor survival rate.

The molecular nature of the mutation that causes sinonasal undifferentiated carcinoma is still poorly understood.

== Treatment ==
Published findings on sinonasal undifferentiated carcinoma suggest that multimodality treatment, or multiple processes combined into a single treatment strategy, gives patients the best possible chance for survival.

Varying combinations of and length between surgery, radiation, and chemotherapy have been tested.

Findings from Mendenhall et al. suggest that surgery plus radiotherapy and concomitant chemotherapy is more efficient than radiotherapy combined with induced or maintenance chemotherapy.

== Prognosis ==
In a meta-analysis of 28 published papers including 158 patients presenting with sinonasal undifferentiated carcinoma with an average of 14 months of follow-up, 25% of patients were alive with no evidence of the disease, 22.4% were alive with presence of the disease, and 52.6% were deceased due to the disease.

== See also ==
- Head and neck cancer
- Nasal cavity
