= Harmonograph =

Device using pendulums to create images

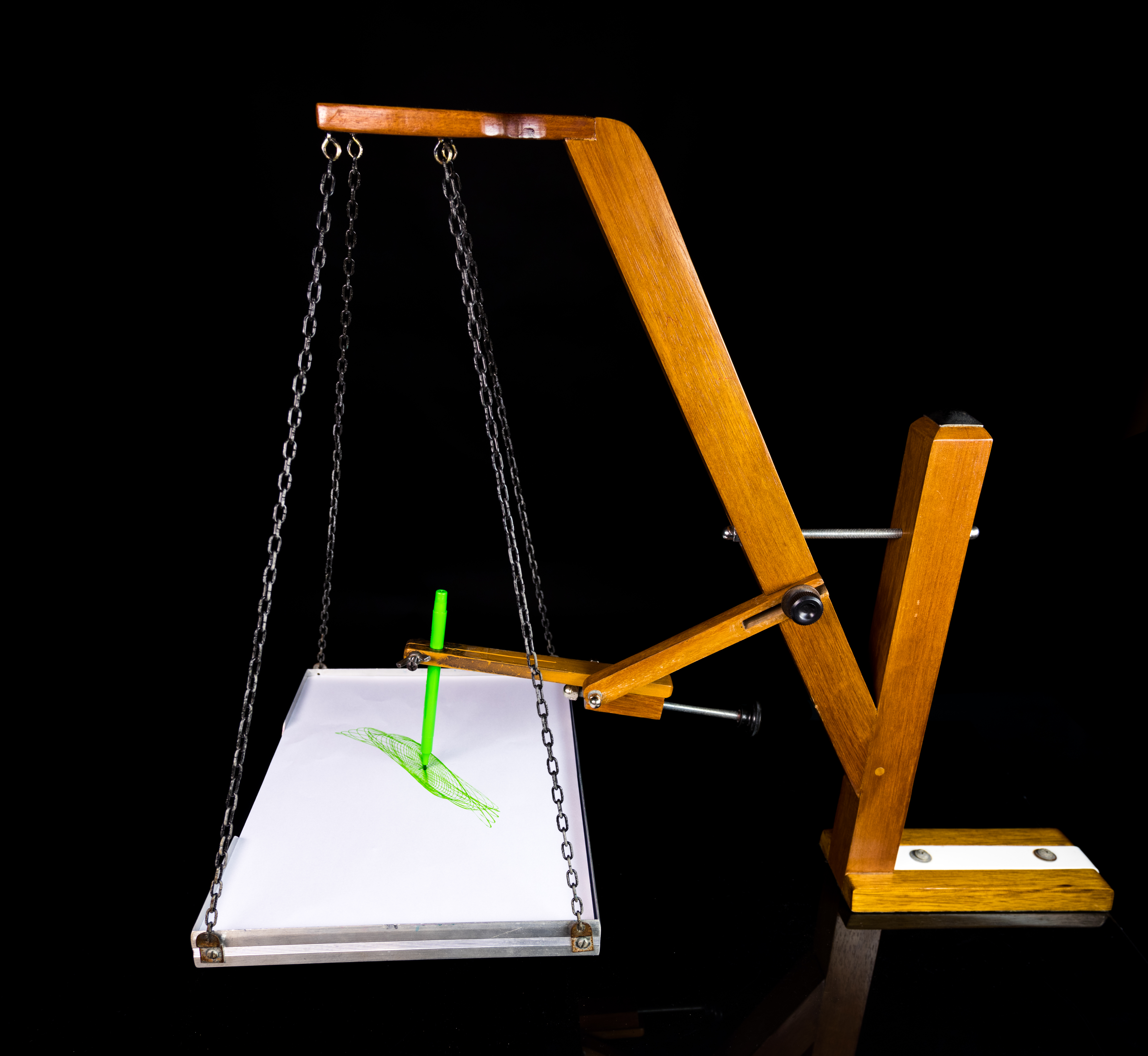
Harmonograph

A harmonograph

A harmonograph is a mechanical apparatus that employs pendulums to create a geometric image. The drawings created typically are Lissajous curves or related drawings of greater complexity. The devices, which began to appear in the mid-19th century and peaked in popularity in the 1890s, cannot be conclusively attributed to a single person, although Hugh Blackburn, a professor of mathematics at the University of Glasgow, is commonly believed to be the official inventor.

A simple, so-called "lateral" harmonograph uses two pendulums to control the movement of a pen relative to a drawing surface. One pendulum moves the pen back and forth along one axis, and the other pendulum moves the drawing surface back and forth along a perpendicular axis. By varying the frequency and phase of the pendulums relative to one another, different patterns are created. Even a simple harmonograph as described can create ellipses, spirals, figure eights and other Lissajous figures.

More complex harmonographs incorporate three or more pendulums or linked pendulums together (for example, hanging one pendulum off another), or involve rotary motion, in which one or more pendulums is mounted on gimbals to allow movement in any direction.

A particular type of harmonograph, a pintograph, is based on the relative motion of two rotating disks, as illustrated in the links below. (A pintograph is not to be confused with a pantograph, which is a mechanical device used to enlarge figures.)

== History ==
In the 1870s, the term harmonograph is attested in connection with A. E. Donkin and devices built by Samuel Charles Tisley.

== Blackburn pendulum ==
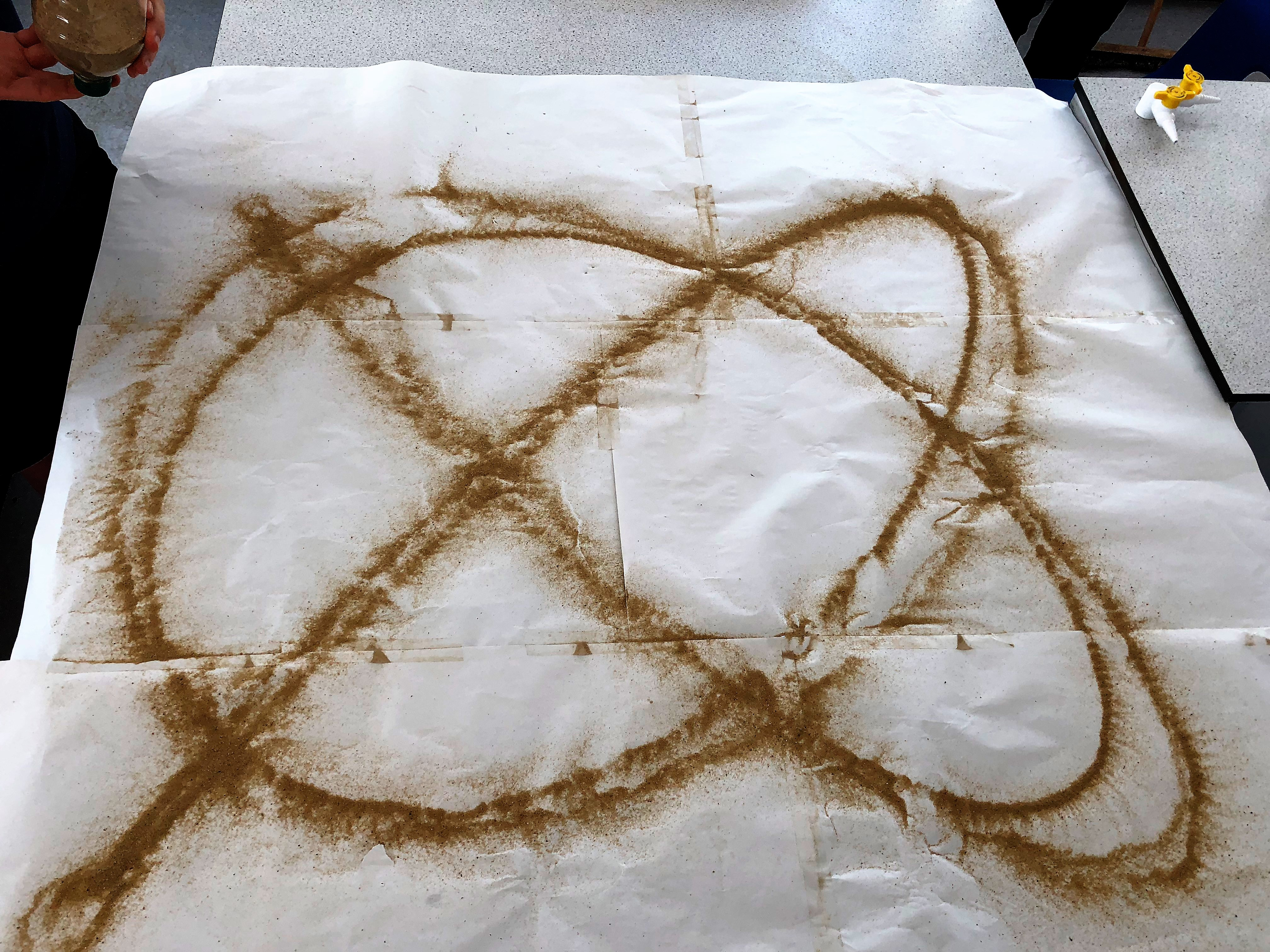
A Lissajous figure, made by releasing sand from a container at the end of a Blackburn pendulum

A Blackburn pendulum is a device for illustrating simple harmonic motion, it was named after Hugh Blackburn, who described it in 1844. This was first discussed by James Dean in 1815 and analyzed mathematically by Nathaniel Bowditch in the same year. A bob is suspended from a string that in turn hangs from a V-shaped pair of strings, so that the pendulum oscillates simultaneously in two perpendicular directions with different periods. The bob consequently follows a path resembling a Lissajous curve; it belongs to the family of mechanical devices known as harmonographs.

Mid-20th century physics textbooks sometimes refer to this type of pendulum as a double pendulum.

== Computer-generated harmonograph figure ==
A harmonograph creates its figures using the movements of damped pendulums. The movement of a damped pendulum is described by the equation

$$x(t) = A \sin (tf + p) e^{-dt},$$

in which $f$ represents frequency, $p$ represents phase, $A$ represents amplitude, $d$ represents damping and $t$ represents time. If that pendulum can move about two axes (in a circular or elliptical shape), due to the principle of superposition, the motion of a rod connected to the bottom of the pendulum along one axis will be described by the equation

$$x(t) = A_1 \sin (tf_1 + p_1) e^{-d_1t} + A_2 \sin (tf_2 + p_2) e^{-d_2t}.$$

A typical harmonograph has two pendulums that move in such a fashion, and a pen that is moved by two perpendicular rods connected to these pendulums. Therefore, the path of the harmonograph figure is described by the parametric equations

$$\begin{align}
x(t) &= A_1 \sin (tf_1 + p_1) e^{-d_1t} + A_2 \sin (tf_2 + p_2) e^{-d_2t},\\
y(t) &= A_3 \sin (tf_3 + p_3) e^{-d_3t} + A_4 \sin (tf_4 + p_4) e^{-d_4t}.
\end{align}$$

An appropriate computer program can translate these equations into a graph that emulates a harmonograph. Applying the first equation a second time to each equation can emulate a moving piece of paper (see the figure below).

== Gallery ==
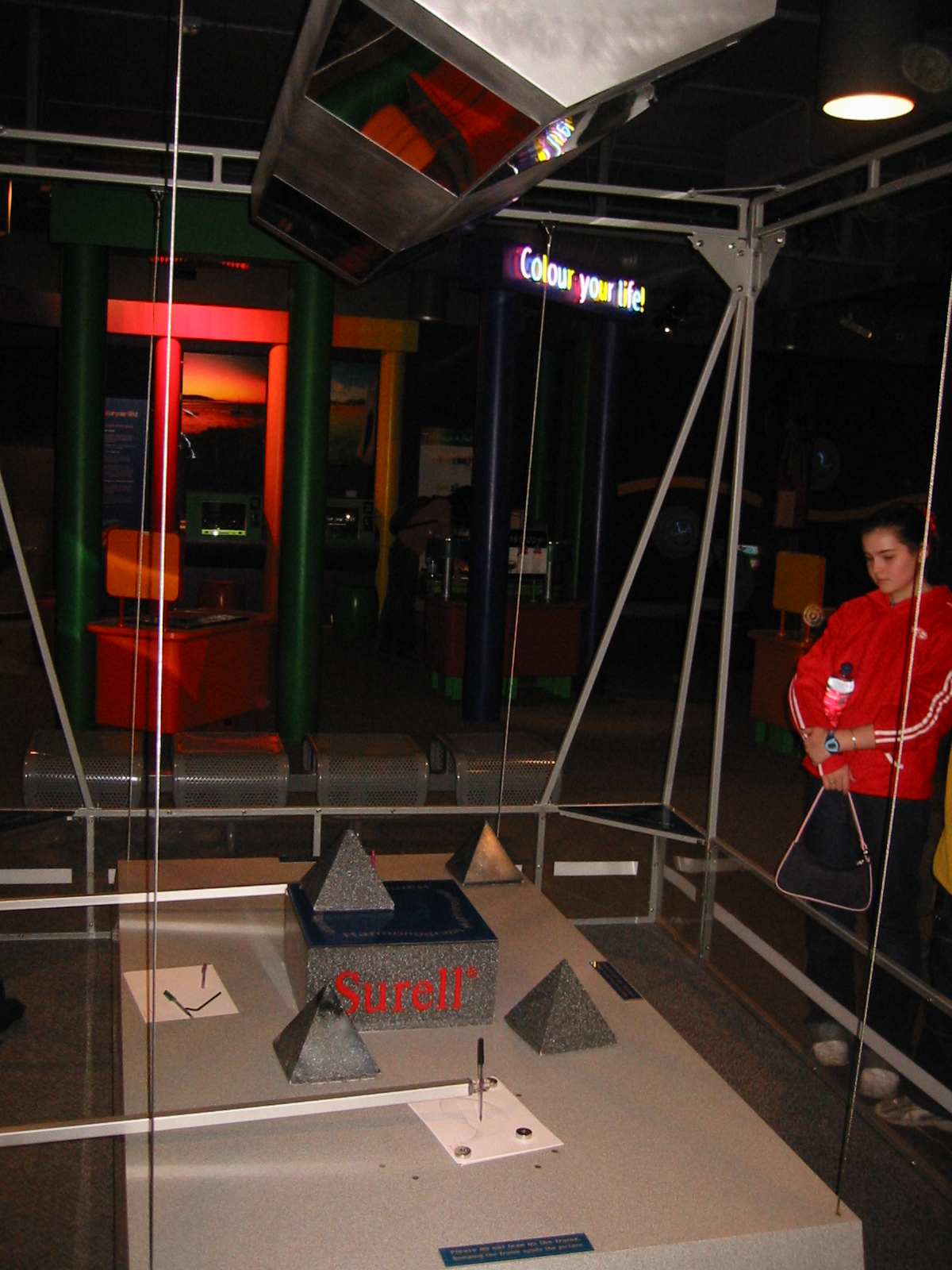
A harmonograph at Questacon in Canberra, Australia

A figure produced by a simple lateral harmonograph

A figure produced by a simple lateral harmonograph

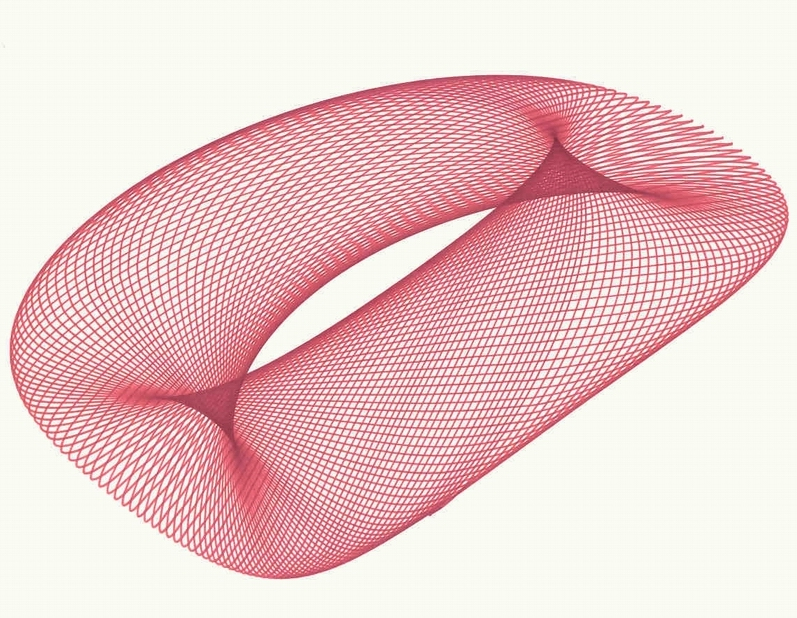
A figure produced by a pintograph

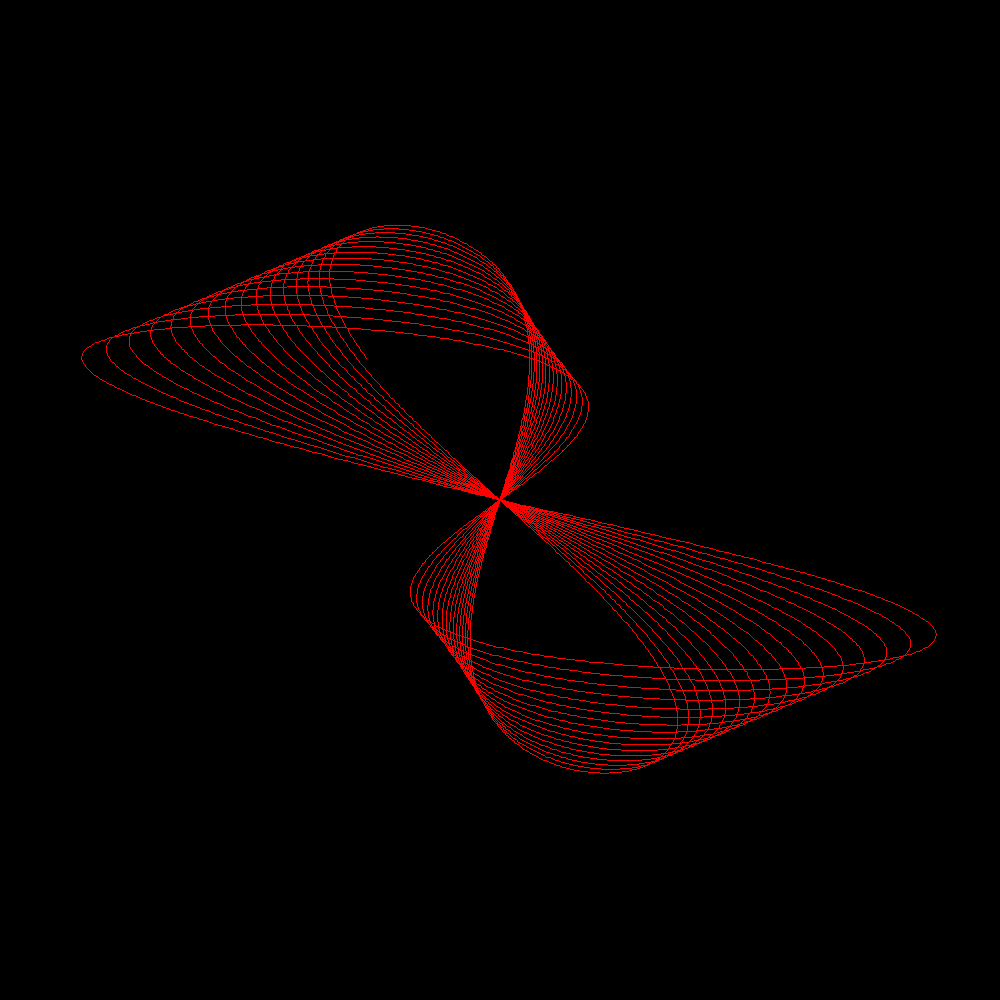
Computer-generated harmonograph figure

== See also ==
- Spirograph
