= Orbray =

Orbray Co., Ltd.
- Native name: オーブレー株式会社
- Type: Kabushiki gaisha
- Founded: 28 August 1953
- Headquarters: Adachi-ku, Tokyo, Japan
- Key people: Namiki Riyako (CEO)
- Products: Industrial jewel components Optical components DC coreless motors Medical devices
- Total equity: ¥100 million (US$911,161.73)
- Website: https://orbray.com/

Orbray Co., Ltd. (オーブレー株式会社 Orbray Kabushiki-gaisha) is a Japanese precision components manufacturer based in Tokyo, Japan.

== Overview ==
The company was founded in 1939 as Namiki Seisakusho to make jewel bearings for electric meters. In 1953, the company was reorganized as Namiki Precision Jewel Co., Ltd. In 1957, Adamant Shoji Co., Ltd., was spun off from Namiki Precision Jewel Co., Ltd., in order to segregate sales by source. Namiki Precision Jewel Co., Ltd., expanded into the manufacture and sales of magnetic heads, exterior parts for watches, DC coreless motors, and medical devices. As one of the first manufacturers of vibration motors for pagers and cell phones, the company at one time held most of the global market share. Meanwhile, Adamant Shoji Co., Ltd. (which changed its name to Adamant Kogyo, Co., Ltd., in 1959; and then to Adamant Co., Ltd., in 2014), developed its business around optical communications components. In 2017, to take advantage of their synergies in precision processing, Adamant Co., Ltd., integrated into Namiki Precision Jewel Co., Ltd., forming Adamant Namiki Precision Jewel Co., Ltd., on January 1, 2018. In 2019, the company began manufacturing and selling its Optical Inner Wall Metrology System. In 2022, the company succeeded in the "development of 2-inch heteroepitaxial diamond growth by the step-flow growth method." In November 2022, the company started test sales of a "large, 12-inch (Φ300mm) sapphire substrate." The company changed its name to Orbray Co., Ltd., on January 1, 2023.

In May 2023, Orbray and MIRISE Technologies Corporation began collaborating on vertical diamond power devices that will contribute to carbon neutrality.

== History ==
See Namiki Precision Jewel Co., Ltd. and Adamant Co., Ltd. for the history of each company prior to the January 1, 2023 intragroup merger.

Adamant Namiki Precision Jewel Co., Ltd., and Akita Adamant Co., Ltd., were merged; the company name was changed to Orbray Co., Ltd., on January 1, 2023.

== Primary Business ==
=== Precision jewel parts ===
Precision jewel parts are components manufactured through the precision processing of hard materials such as diamond, sapphire, and ruby. Such parts enable machines and products to be more durable and complex. These parts can withstand high-temperature conditions, as they have high melting points. They can also be used in strongly acidic and alkaline environments due to their chemical stability. These parts are suitable for applications requiring insulation properties, too. In the past, precision jewel parts were used only in limited fields because of the high cost of the materials. In recent years, however, technologies for producing diamond, sapphire, and ruby crystals have advanced remarkably, resulting in significant improvement in their shape, quality, and cost efficiency. At its in-house factories, Orbray produces diamond, sapphire, ceramics, and other materials, from which it create its precision parts.

=== DC coreless motors / Motor units ===
In 1973, Orbray developed a 10mm diameter DC coreless motor, the world's smallest at the time, through its research into manufacturing methods for rare-earth magnets and precious metal brushes, along with the acquisition of a patent for coreless winding technology from a German company. In 2004, Orbray developed a 1.5mm diameter geared motor (which was awarded the Prime Minister's Prize in 2006), and in 2014 it developed a 0.6mm diameter brushless motor. In addition to coreless motors and brushless motors, Orbray produces gearheads, encoders, control boards, and other motion control devices. Additionally, Orbray has developed motion control units that further combine various mechanisms.

=== Fiber optic components ===
Zirconia ferrules and sleeves, which are components for optical communications systems and networks, are the core products within Orbray's fiber optic segment. These components can be used with various types of optical fiber, optical connectors, and optical devices. Orbray also manufactures pin gauges and ring gauges, which can be used to measure and inspect the inner diameters and outer diameters of ferrules and sleeves requiring precise dimensions at nanometer tolerances. In addition, Orbray makes a variety of optical connectors and adapters using the same ferrule and sleeve components. In the field of optical devices, Orbray makes master cords, various patch cords, and converting adapters that connect different types of industry connectors. Orbray also supplies attenuators and terminators for optical devices, as well as fiber arrays used for connecting PLC (Power Line Communication) and AWG (American Wire Gauge).

=== Medical devices ===
Orbray has been developing and manufacturing medical devices for the global market since the 1980s. Orbray's factory in Thailand is a registered ISO13485 certified medical device manufacturing site. It has established a quality management system based on international medical device standards, delivering products to the global market that meet the requirements of the US FDA, as well as the health, safety, and environmental protection standards of the European Economic Area, as indicated by the CE (Conformité Européenne) mark.

=== Diamond ===
Of all of the natural materials on Earth, it has the best properties in terms of hardness, sound velocity, thermal conductivity, and Young's modulus, as well as high transmittance of light, spanning a wide range from extreme ultraviolet to far infrared. In addition, diamond has high thermal and chemical stability. Furthermore, the conductivity of diamond can be controlled to make it either an insulator or a metal-like conductor. All of these properties can be combined to create heat sinks, tools, optical parts, and many other precision products that can be applied to acoustics, sensors, and even semiconductors.

Orbray has developed a heteroepitaxial growth method to produce large-diameter diamond substrates. Orbray's heteroepitaxial method uses materials other than diamond in the basal layer. This method allows the growth of diamond crystals that are the same diameter as the basal layer. In 2022, Orbray developed a step-flow growth process that precisely controls the sapphire crystal used as the basal layer for diamond growth. The diamond crystal grows laterally on an iridium/sapphire underlayer that has a slightly inclined surface. With this method, Orbray is able to consistently produce diamond substrates of 2 inches (55 mm) in diameter.

== Global operations ==
=== Japan ===
- Yuzawa Factory (Akita Yuzawa )
- Yuzawa Second Factory (Akita Yuzawa)
- Orbray [TRAD] (Akita Yuzawa )
- Yokote Factory (Akita Yokote )
- Kuroishi Factory (Aomori Kuroishi )

=== Overseas ===
- Orbray New Jersey Inc. (USA)
- Orbray California Inc. (USA)
- Orbray Europe GmbH (Germany)
- Orbray Singapore Pte. Ltd. (Singapore)
- Orbray (Thailand) Co., Ltd. (Thailand)
