= Integrated passive devices =

Multiple electronic componets in a single package

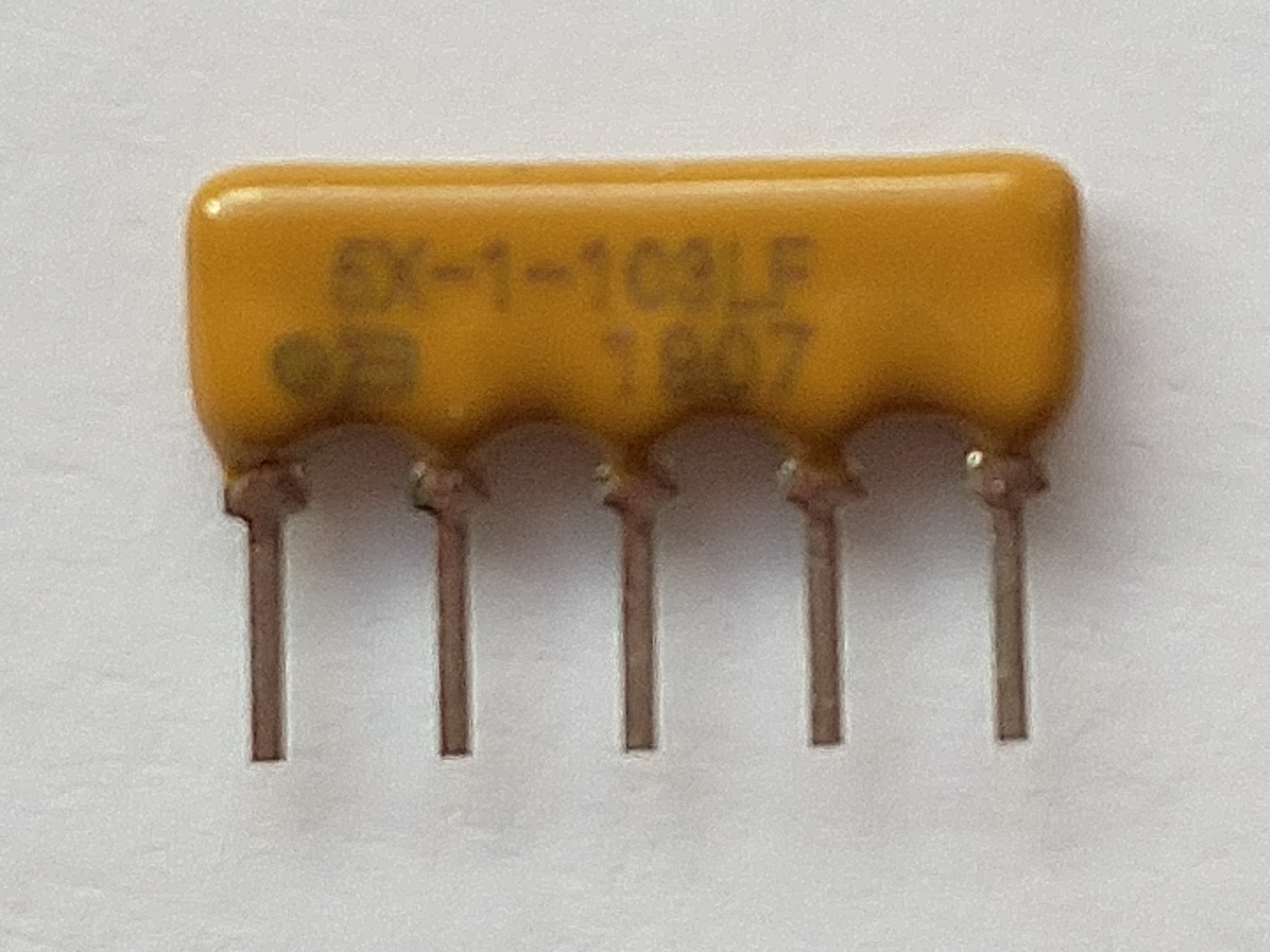
This single-in-line package contains four resistors. Each resistor is connected to the first four respective pins, while the last pin is common to all of them

Integrated passive devices (IPDs), also known as integrated passive components (IPCs) or embedded passive components (EPC), are electronic components where resistors (R), capacitors (C), inductors (L), microstriplines, impedance matching elements, baluns or any combinations of them are integrated in the same package or on the same substrate. Sometimes integrated passives can also be called as embedded passives, and still the difference between integrated and embedded passives is technically unclear. In both cases passives are realized in between dielectric layers or on the same substrate.

The earliest form of IPDs are resistor, capacitor, resistor-capacitor (RC) or resistor-capacitor-coil/inductor (RCL) networks. Passive transformers can also be realised as integrated passive devices like by putting two coils on top of each other separated by a thin dielectric layer. Sometimes diodes (PN, PIN, zener etc.) can be integrated on the same substrate with integrated passives specifically if the substrate is silicon or some other semiconductor like gallium arsenide (GaAs).

== Description ==
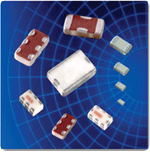
IPDs (IPCs) Single SMT chip solutions for Bandpass, Lowpass, HighPass, and other combinations based on LC, RC etc. integrated networks on a ceramic substrate

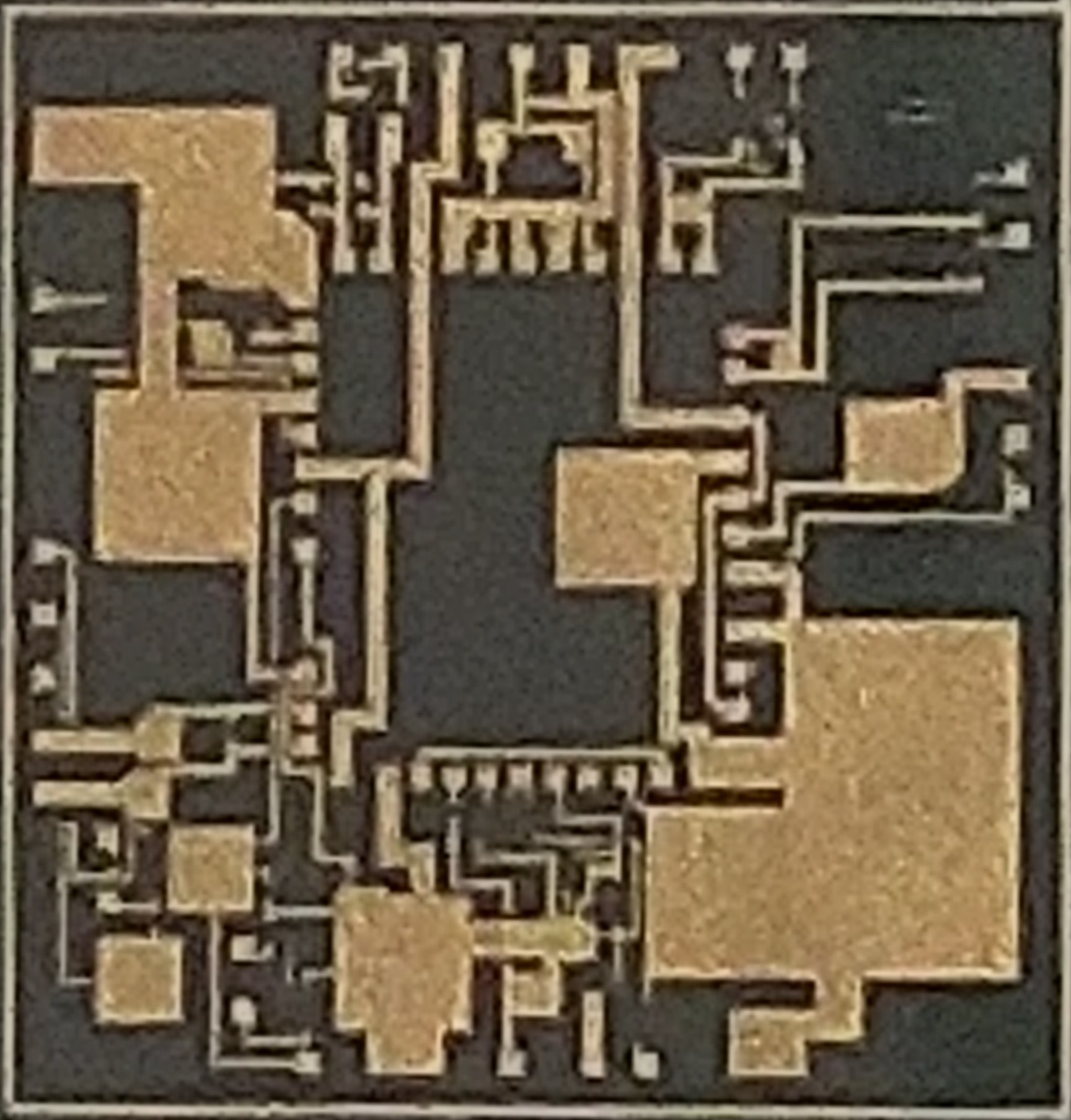
Integrated passives (resistors and capacitors) on high resistive silicon substrate coated by thick silicon dioxide

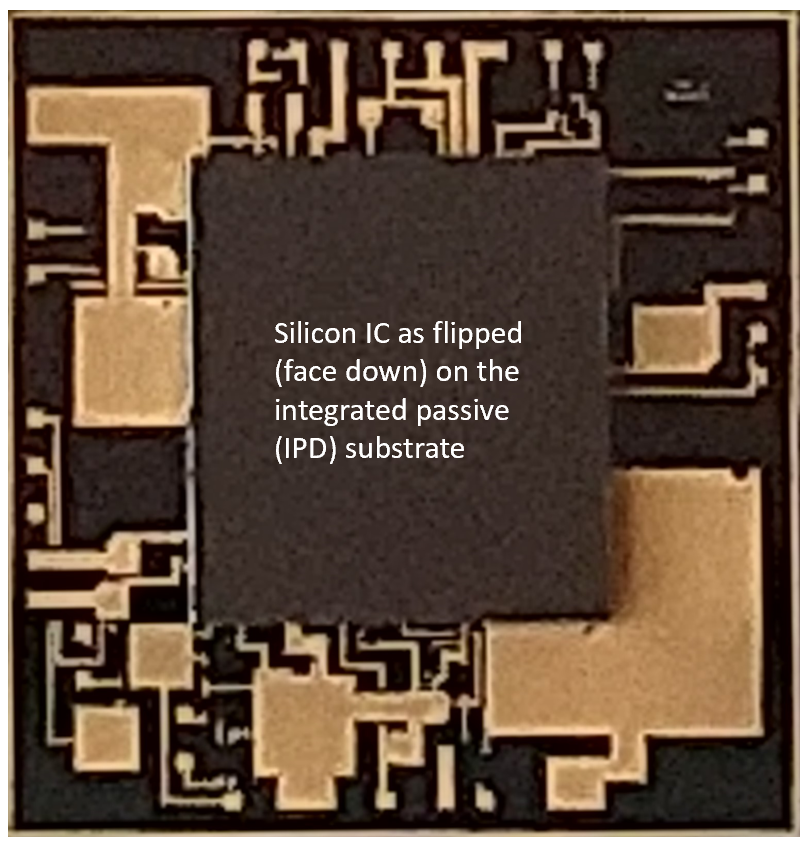
Active IC flipped as face down on the integrated passive substrate enabling 2D integration

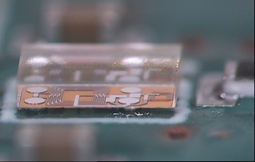
Example of RF IPD balun on Glass Substrate

Integrated passive devices can be packaged, bare dies/chips or even stacked (assembled on top of some other bare die/chip) in a third dimension (3D) with active integrated circuits or other IPDs in an electronic system assembly. Typical packages for integrated passives are SIL (Standard In Line), SIP or any other packages (like DIL, DIP, QFN, chip-scale package/CSP, wafer level package/WLP etc.) used in electronic packaging. Integrated passives can also act as a module substrate, and therefore be part of a hybrid module, multi-chip module or chiplet module/implementation.

The substrate for IPDs can be rigid like ceramic (aluminumoxide/alumina), layered ceramic (low temperature co-fired ceramic/LTCC, high temperature co-fired ceramic/HTCC), glass, and silicon coated with some dielectric layer like silicon dioxide. The substrate can be also flexible like laminate e. g. a package interposer (called as an active interposer), FR4 or similar, Kapton or any other suitable polyimide. It is beneficial for the electronics system design if the effect of the substrate and the possible package to the performance of IPDs can be neglected or known.

Manufacturing of IPDs used include thick and thin film technologies and variety of integrated circuit processing steps or modifications (like thicker or different metals than aluminum or copper) of them. Integrated passives are available as standard components/parts or as custom designed (for a specific application) devices.

== Applications ==
Integrated passive devices are mainly used as standard parts or custom designed due to

- needs to reduce number of parts to be assembled in an electronic system resulting minimized logistics needed.
- needs to miniaturize (area and height) electronics like for medical (hearing aid equipment), wearable (watches, intelligent rings, wearable heart rate monitors) and portable use (mobile phones, tablets etc.). Striplines, baluns etc can be miniaturized with IPDs with smaller tolerances in radio frequency (RF) parts of the system specifically if thin film technology is used. IPD chips can be stacked with active or other integrated passive chips if ultimate miniaturisation is the target.
- needs to reduce weight of electronic assemblies for example in space, aerospace or in unmanned aerial vehicles (UAVs like drones) applications
- electronic designs, which require numerous passives with the same value like several one nanofarad (1 nF) capacitors. This may happen in implementations where integrated circuits (ICs) with a high input/output count are needed/used. Many high speed signals or power supply lines may need stabilization by capacitors. Emergence of digital implementations leads to use digital parallel lines (4-, 8-, 16-, 32-, 64-bit etc.) and stabilization of all signal lines resulting capacitor islands in the implementation. Miniaturization of those may result to use integrated capacitor networks or arrays of capacitors. They may also be implemented as part (embedded) of an integrated circuit package like BGA or CSP (chip scale package) substrate or interposer of packages.
- electronic designs which require numerous electromagnetic interference (EMI) or electrostatic discharge (ESD) suppression functionality like designs with high input/output pin count connectors in interfaces. EMI or ESD suppression typically is realized with RC or R(C)-diode networks.
- limitations of performance (like Q factors of the coils) and values (like large capacitance values) of passive elements available in integrated circuit technologies like CMOS as monolithically integrated with active elements (transistors etc.). If size (area or thickness) and/or weight of electronics assembly need to be minimized and standard parts are not available, custom IPDs might be the only option towards smallest number of parts, small size or weight of electronics.
- improved reliability if interfaces between different technologies (monolithic, packaging, electronics and optics/photonics, assemblies like surface mount technology and integrated circuits etc.) needs to be minimised.
- timing in some applications, if for example there are critical needs for fast and very precise filtering (R(L)C etc.) — and SMD discrete part based solution is not fast enough or not predictable enough.

The challenge of custom IPDs compared to standard integrated or discrete passives however is the availability time for the assembly and sometimes also the performance. Depending on the manufacturing technology of integrated passives high capacitance or resistor values with a required tolerance may be hard to meet. Q value of coils/inductors might also be limited by the thickness of the metals available in the implementation. However new materials and improved manufacturing techniques like atomic layer deposition (ALD) and understanding manufacturing and control of thick metal alloys on large substrates improve capacitance density and Q value of coils/inductors.

Therefore in prototyping and small/medium size production phase standard parts/passives are in many cases the fastest way to the realization. Custom designed passives can be considered to be used after careful technical and economical analysis in volume manufacturing, if time-to-market and cost targets of the product(s) can be met. Therefore integrated passive devices are continuously technically and economically challenged by decreasing size, improving tolerances, improving accuracy of assembly techniques (like SMT, surface-mount technology) of system motherboards and cost of discrete/separate passive devices. Going forward discrete and integrated passives will complement each other technically. Development and understanding of new materials and assembly techniques are a key enabler for both integrated and discrete passive devices.

== Fabrication ==
=== IPDs on a silicon substrate ===
IPDs on a silicon substrate are generally fabricated using standard wafer fabrication technologies such as thin film and photolithography processing. For avoiding possible parasitic effects due to semiconductive silicon high resistive silicon substrate is typically used for integrated passives. IPDs on silicon can be designed as flip chip mountable or wire bondable components. However to differentiate technically from active integrated circuit (IC) technologies IPD technologies may utilise thicker metal (for higher Q value of inductors) or different resistive (like SiCr) layers, thinner or different higher K (higher dielectric constant) dielectric layers (like PZT instead of silicon dioxide or silicon nitride) for higher capacitance density than with typical IC technologies.

IPDs on silicon can be grinded — if needed — below 100 μm in thickness and with many packaging options (micro-bumping, wire bonding, copper pads) and delivery mode options (as wafers, bare dies, tape & reel).

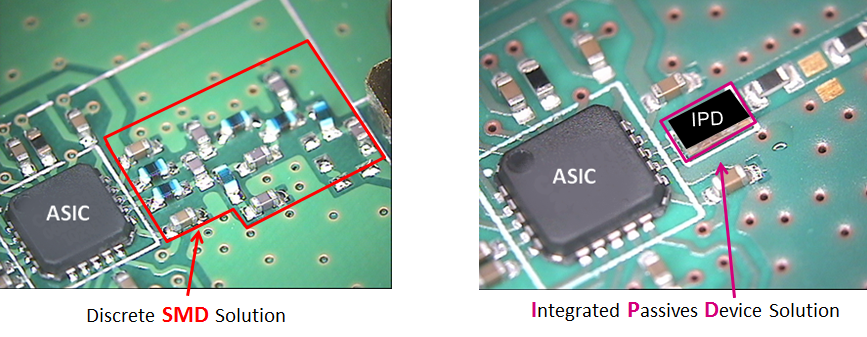
Integrated Passive Device versus Discrete Surface Mount Devices (SMD)

3D passive integration in silicon is one of the technologies used to manufacture Integrated Passive Devices (IPDs), enabling high-density trench capacitors, metal-insulator-metal (MIM) capacitors, resistors, high-Q inductors, PIN, Schottky or Zener diodes to be implemented in silicon. The design time of IPDs on silicon depends on complexity of the design but can be made by using same design tools and environment what is used for application-specific integrated circuits (ASICs) or integrated circuits. Some IPD suppliers offer full design kit support so that System in Package (SiP) module manufacturers or system houses are able to design their own IPDs fulfilling their specific application requirements.

== History ==
In early control system design it was discovered that having same value of components makes design easier and faster. One way to implement passive components with same value or in practice with smallest possible distribution is to place them on the same substrate near to each other.

Earliest form of integrated passive devices were resistor networks in the 1960s when four to eight resistors were packaged in form of Single-in-line package (SIP) by Vishay Intertechnology. Many other type of packages like DILs, DIPs etc. used in packaging integrated circuits even customised packages are used for integrated passive devices. Resistor, capacitor, and resistor capacitor networks are still widely used in systems even though monolithic integration has progressed.

Today portable electronic systems include roughly 2–40 discrete passive devices/integrated circuit or module. This shows that monolithic or module integration is not capable to include all functionality based on passive components in system realisations, and variety of technologies is needed to minimize logistics and system size. This is the application area for IPDs. Most — by number — of the passives in electronic systems are typically capacitors followed by number of resistors and inductors/coils.

Many functional blocks such as impedance matching circuits, harmonic filters, couplers and baluns and power combiner/divider can be realized by IPDs technology.

Trends towards applications with small size, portability and wireless connectivity have stretched various implementation technologies to be able to realize passive components. In 2021, there were 25 - 30 companies delivering integrated passive (including simple passive networks and passives on various substrates like glass, silicon and alumina) devices worldwide.

== See also ==
- Electronic component#Passive components, for discrete devices
- Surface-mount technology
- Integrated circuit
