= Aquos Phone Xx 203SH =

2013 smartphone model

AQUOS PHONE Xx SoftBank 203SH
- Brand: SoftBank Mobile
- Manufacturer: Sharp
- Type: Smartphone
- Series: SoftBank Smartphone
- First released: March 8, 2013; 13 years ago
- Predecessor: AQUOS PHONE Xx 106SH
- Successor: AQUOS PHONE Xx 206SH
- Compatible networks: SoftBank 3G (W-CDMA, 900 MHz band); GSM; SoftBank 4G (AXGP)
- Form factor: Slate
- Colors: Urban Black; White; Blue; Red
- Dimensions: 137 mm (5.4 in) H 69 mm (2.7 in) W 10.9 mm (0.43 in) D
- Weight: 146 g (5.1 oz)
- Operating system: Android 4.1
- System-on-chip: Qualcomm Snapdragon S4 Pro APQ8064
- CPU: 1.5 GHz quad-core
- Memory: 2 GB RAM
- Storage: 32 GB ROM
- Removable storage: microSD (up to 2 GB) microSDHC (up to 32 GB) microSDXC (up to 64 GB)
- SIM: microSIM (NFC-compatible)
- Battery: 2200 mAh (non-removable)
- Charging: AC adapter: approx. 230 min DC adapter: approx. 300 min
- Rear camera: 16.3 MP backside-illuminated CMOS, f/1.9 aperture, 1080p FHD video recording, image stabilization, face recognition, voice-activated shutter
- Front camera: 1.2 MP CMOS
- Display: 4.9 in (120 mm) IGZO LCD, HD (1280×720 pixels), approx. 16.77 million colors
- Water resistance: Waterproof / Dustproof
- Model: 203SH

The AQUOS PHONE Xx 203SH is a 3.9G SoftBank 4G smartphone developed by Sharp for SoftBank Mobile. Part of the SoftBank Smartphone series, it runs on the Android 4.1 operating system.

== History ==
- October 9, 2012 – Announced by SoftBank Mobile.
- March 2 to March 10, 2013 – Television commercials aired across Kanto, Kansai, Tokai, Hokkaido, Miyagi, Hiroshima, and Fukuoka regions.
- March 8, 2013 – Official commercial release.

== Specifications ==
The device served as SoftBank's flagship model for the spring 2013 season. Its hardware specifications mostly inherit those of its sibling model, the AQUOS PHONE ZETA SH-02E for NTT Docomo, though it incorporates various refinements, including a lighter build. Serving as the successor to the 106SH, it upgrades to a 1.5 GHz quad-core CPU, 2 GB of RAM, and an Android 4.1 operating system alongside a 16.3-megapixel backside-illuminated CMOS camera.

A newly added feature over the 106SH is support for NFC, including payment services. However, existing microSIM cards are incompatible, requiring users upgrading to the 203SH to issue an NFC-compatible microSIM card.

Although the main display was originally intended to use Super CG Silicon, it was changed to an IGZO LCD to improve battery efficiency. Such a specification change following an announcement is highly unusual, even in the rapidly growing smartphone market.

The battery capacity is 2200 mAh, which is slightly smaller than the SH-02E's 2320 mAh capacity. However, due to enhanced power-saving capabilities, continuous talk time was significantly extended. Like the SH-02E and PANTONE 6 200SH, the battery is non-removable, requiring paid repair services for replacements. Compared to the SH-02E, the overall device weight was reduced substantially, placing it close in weight to its predecessor, the 106SH.

The physical design features a home button located on the lower left front, allowing users to wake the display from sleep mode easily. This button also functions as the quick launcher key common to Sharp smartphones for SoftBank Mobile. While simple and rectangular from the front, the sides and back utilize a complex combination of gentle curves.

=== Features and Software ===
The smartphone comes preinstalled with the iWnn Japanese input method and supports FeliCa/NFC payment services, infrared communication, Bluetooth 4.0, and 1seg TV tuning capabilities.

Key Supported Services
Touchscreen	HD LCD 4.9 inches	Full browser	SoftBank 4G
Battery Capacity 2200 mAh	Tethering	Wi-Fi	GPS
16.3 MP Camera	1seg	Digital audio player (AAC) (WMA)	Osaifu-Keitai / NFC
Bluetooth	Infrared Communication	Emergency Alert Mail	Waterproof / Dustproof

== See also ==
- AQUOS PHONE
  - AQUOS PHONE Xx 106SH – Predecessor model.
  - AQUOS PHONE Xx 206SH – Successor model.
  - AQUOS PHONE ZETA SH-02E – Sibling model for NTT Docomo supporting the Xi network; features a non-removable battery.
  - AQUOS PHONE SERIE SHL21 – Lower-tier model for au with a 4.7-inch S-CG Silicon display, MSM8960 1.5 GHz dual-core CPU, and non-removable battery.
- PANTONE 6 200SH – Lower-tier model under the PANTONE brand with a non-removable battery.
- Sharp
