= Adamant Namiki Precision Jewel Co =

Japanese precision components manufacturer

Adamant Namiki Precision Jewel Co., Ltd. アダマンド並木精密宝石株式会社
- Type: Private KK
- Founded: 28 August 1953
- Headquarters: Adachi-ku, Tokyo, Japan
- Key people: Riyako Namiki (President and CEO)
- Products: Industrial jewel components, Optical components, DC coreless Motors, Medical devices
- Website: www.ad-na.com

Adamant Namiki Precision Jewel Co., Ltd. (アダマンド並木精密宝石, Adamanto Namiki Seimitsu Houseki Kabushiki-gaisha) is a Japanese precision components manufacturer based in Tokyo, Japan.

== Overview ==
In 1939, Namiki Precision Jewel Co., Ltd. started business as a manufacturer of synthetic sapphire jewel bearings for electrical measuring instruments. It later began selling these jewel bearings for use in watches in the 1960s. In 1957, Adamant Shoji (renamed Adamant Kogyo Co., Ltd. in 1959, and Adamant Co., Ltd. in 2014) was founded as a spin-off of Namiki as a result of business practices of the time. Thereafter, Namiki developed its product lineup primarily focusing on industrial jewel components, DC coreless motors, and medical devices. Meanwhile, Adamant Shoji's business focused mainly on optical communication components. In 2017, Namiki and Adamant mutually agreed to unite their specialties to take their technologies and products to the next level. As a result, Adamant Namiki Precision Jewel Co., Ltd. was established on January 1, 2018.

== History ==
See Namiki Precision Jewel Co., Ltd. and Adamant Co., Ltd. for the history of each company prior to the January 1, 2018 intragroup merger.

Namiki merged with its subsidiary company, Adamant Co., Ltd., on January 1, 2018, and changed its name to Adamant Namiki Precision Jewel Co., Ltd.

== Primary business ==
=== Industrial jewel components ===
Adamant Namiki uses integrated manufacturing, handling its products from the raw material, to processing, through to polishing. Industrial jewels, such as diamond, sapphire, and ruby, are used for jewel bearings, sapphire substrates, exterior watch parts, semiconductor wire bonding capillaries, nozzles, LTCC(Co-fired ceramic) and so on. For sapphire product growth, Adamant Namiki employs the highly productive EFG method. In 2021, the company succeeded in developing a mass production method for 2-inch diamond wafers. Adamant Namiki also supplies ceramic parts, combining precision processing and various molding technologies, such as injection, powder press, and CIP molding, to provide a diverse range of products.

=== Optical components ===
Adamant Namiki offers optical components with a focus on ferrules, sleeves, and connectors.
A ferrule is a component to link optical fibers together and high-precision (less than 1 micrometer) processing technology is required to ensure the secure connection of several micrometer optical fiber cores.
Adamant Namiki also combines its high-precision processing and assembly technologies to provide optical device components such as receptacles and pigtails, optical switches using MEMS(Microelectromechanical systems) technology, and optical devices such as variable attenuators.

=== DC coreless motors ===
Since developing the smallest coreless motor of the time in 1973, Adamant Namiki has been consistently producing miniature DC coreless motors. The core components have evolved with high-precision processing technology and a more optimal magnetic circuit has produced a high-efficiency motor. In 2009, Adamant Namiki successfully developed the world's smallest DC brushless motor at 0.6mm in diameter. The company also produces motor units such as its de-energized locking system, micro robot servo, multi-finger robotic hand, and micro mechanisms.

=== Medical devices ===
Since the start of OEM manufacturing of its computer-controlled infusion pump in 1987, Adamant Namiki has established a line of business that offers medical device development, manufacturing, and service.

== Global operations ==
=== Japan ===
- Akita Yuzawa Factory
- Aomori Kuroishi Factory
- Akita Adamant Company Limited

=== Overseas ===
- Adamant America Inc.
- Namiki Precision of California, Inc.
- Namiki Precision Singapore Pte. Ltd.
- Namiki Precision (Thailand) Co., Ltd.
