= Thick-film technology =

Technology used to produce electronic components

Thick-film technology is used to produce electronic devices/modules such as surface mount devices modules, hybrid integrated circuits, heating elements, integrated passive devices and sensors. The main manufacturing technique is screen printing (stenciling), which in addition to use in manufacturing electronic devices can also be used for various graphic reproduction targets. It became one of the key manufacturing/miniaturisation techniques of electronic devices/modules during 1950s. Typical film thickness – manufactured with thick film manufacturing processes for electronic devices – is 0.0001 to 0.1 mm.

Thick-film circuits/modules are widely used in the automotive industry, both in sensors, e.g. mixture of fuel/air, pressure sensors, engine and gearbox controls, sensor for releasing airbags, ignitors to airbags; common is that high reliability is required, often extended temperature range also along massive thermocycling of circuits without failure. Other application areas are space electronics, consumer electronics, and various measurement systems where low cost and/or high reliability is needed.

The simplest form to utilise a thick film technology is a module substrate/board, where wiring is manufactured using thick film process. Additionally resistors and large tolerance capacitors can be manufactured with thick film methods. Thick film wiring can be made compatible with surface-mount technology (SMT), and if needed (due to tolerances and/or size requirements) surface-mountable parts (resistors, capacitors, ICs, etc.) can be assembled on a thick film substrate.

The manufacturing of thick film devices/modules is an additive process involving deposition of several (typically max 6–8) successive layers of conductive, resistive and dielectric layers onto an electrically insulating substrate using a screen-printing process.

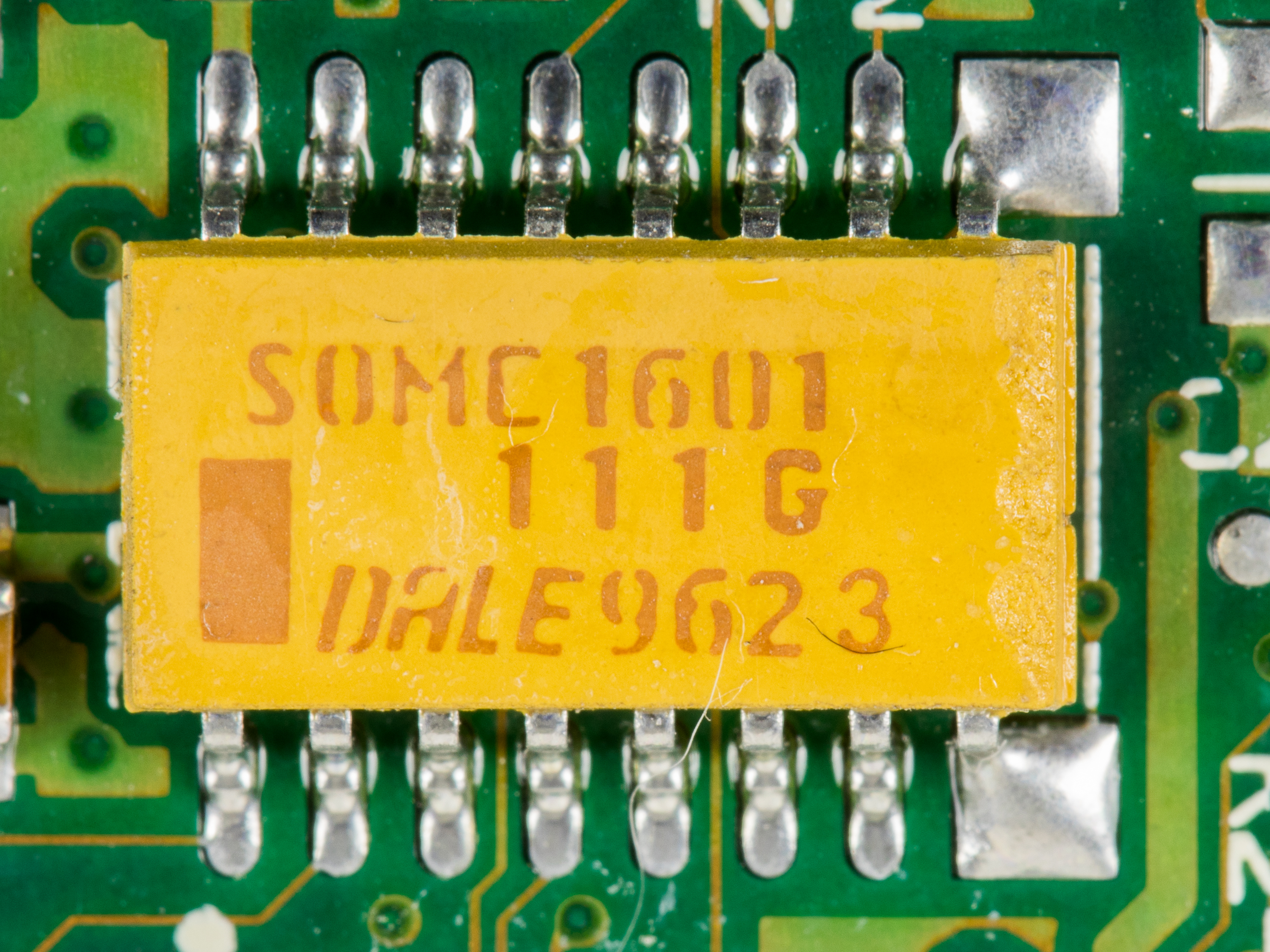
Thick Film Resistor Networks

As a low cost manufacturing method it is applicable to produce large volumes of discrete passive devices like resistors, thermistors, varistors and integrated passive devices.

Thick film technology is also one of the alternatives to be used in hybrid integrated circuits and competes and complements typically in electronics miniaturization (parts or elements/area or volume) with SMT based on PCB (printed circuit board)/PWB (printed wiring board) and thin film technology.

== Steps ==
A typical thick-film process would consist of the following stages:

=== Lasering of substrates ===
Typically thick film circuit substrates are Al_{2}O_{3}/alumina, beryllium oxide (BeO), aluminum nitride (AlN), stainless steel, sometimes even some polymers and in rare cases even silicon (Si) coated with silicon dioxide (SiO_{2})., Commonly used substrates for thick-film processes are 94 or 96% alumina. Alumina is very hard and lasering of the material is the most efficient way to machine it. The thick-film process is also a means of miniaturization, where one substrate normally contains many units (final circuits). With lasering it is possible to scribe, profile and drill holes. Scribing is a process where a line of laser pulses is fired into the material and 30–50% of the material is removed; this weakens the substrate, and after all other processes are completed the substrate can easily be divided into single units. Profiling is, for example, used a lot in sensor fabrication, where a circuit needs to fit round tubes or other different complex shapes. Drilling of holes can provide a "via" (conductive link) between the two sides of the substrate, normally hole sizes are in the range 0.15–0.2 mm.

Lasering before processing the substrates has a cost advantage to lasering or dicing using a diamond saw after processing.

=== Ink preparation ===
Inks for electrodes, terminals, resistors, dielectric layers etc. are commonly prepared by mixing the metal or ceramic powders required with a solvent (ceramic thick film pastes) or polymer pastes to produce a paste for screen-printing. To achieve a homogeneous ink the mixed components of the ink may be passed through a three-roll mill. Alternatively, ready-made inks may be obtained from several companies offering products for the thick-film technologist.

=== Screen-printing and its improvements ===
Screen-printing is the process of transferring an ink through a patterned woven mesh screen or stencil using a squeegee.

For improving accuracy, increasing integration density and improving line and space accuracy of traditional screen-printing photoimageable thick-film technology has been developed. Use of these materials however changes typically the process flow and needs different manufacturing tools.

=== Drying/Curing ===
After allowing time after printing for settling of the ink, each layer of ink that is deposited is usually dried at a moderately high temperature of 50 to 200 °C (122 to 392 °F) to evaporate the liquid component of the ink and fix the layer temporarily in position on the substrate so that it can be handled or stored before final processing. For inks based on polymers and some solder pastes that cure at these temperatures, this may be the final step that is required. Some inks also require curing by exposure to UV light.

=== Firing ===
For many of the metal, ceramic and glass inks used in thick film processes a high temperature (usually greater than 300 °C) firing is required to fix the layers in position permanently on the substrate.

=== Abrasive trimming of resistors ===
After firing the resistors can be trimmed using a precision abrasive cutting method first developed by S.S. White. The method involves a fine abrasive media, usually 0.027 mm aluminum oxide. The abrasive cutting is fed through a carbide nozzle tip that can be of different sizes. The nozzle is advanced through the fired resistor while the resistor element is monitored with probe contacts and when final value is reached the abrasive blast is shut off and the nozzle retracts to the zero start position. The abrasive technique can achieve very high tolerances with no heat and no cracking of the glass frit used in the ink formulation.

=== Laser trimming of resistors ===
After firing, the substrate resistors are trimmed to the correct value. This process is named laser trimming. Many chip resistors are made using thick-film technology. Large substrates are printed with resistors fired, divided into small chips and these are then terminated, so they can be soldered on the PCB. With laser trimming two modes are used; either passive trimming, where each resistor is trimmed to a specific value and tolerance, or active trimming, where the feedback is used to adjust to a specific voltage, frequency or response by laser trimming the resistors on the circuit while powered up.

=== Mounting of capacitors and semiconductors ===
The development of the SMT process actually evolves from the thick film process. Also mounting of naked dies (the actual silicon chip without encapsulation) and wire bonding is a standard process, this provides the basis for miniaturization of the circuits as all the extra encapsulation is not necessary.

=== Separation of elements ===
This step is often necessary because many components are produced on one substrate at the same time. Thus, some means of separating the components from each other is required. This step may be achieved by wafer dicing.

=== Integration of devices ===
At this stage, the devices may require integrating with other electronic components, usually in the form of a printed circuit board. This may be achieved by wire bonding or soldering.

== Process control of thick film manufacturing ==
There are numerous steps in thick film manufacturing which need careful control, like roughness of the substrate, curing temperatures and times of pastes, selected stencil thickness vs. paste type, etc., Therefore the number of pastes used and process steps define the complexity of the process and cost of the final product.

== Designing circuits based on thick-film technology ==
Same or similar electronic design automation tools which are used for designing printed circuit boards can be used for designing thick film circuits. However, the compatibility of tooling formats with stencil manufacturing/manufacturer needs attention as well as the availability of the geometrical, electrical and thermal design rules for simulation and layout design from the final manufacturer.

== See also ==
- Thin film
- Integrated passive devices
- Thermistor
- Surface-mount technology
- Hybrid integrated circuit
