= Namiki Precision Jewel Co =

Namiki Precision Jewel Co., Ltd. 並木精密宝石株式会社 as of January 1, 2023, Orbray Co., Ltd.
- Type: Kabushiki kaisha
- Founded: 28 August 1953
- Headquarters: Adachi-ku, Tokyo, Japan
- Key people: Shoji Namiki (Chairman and CEO); Riyako Namiki, President and CEO
- Products: Industrial jewel parts, Coreless motors, Brushless motors, Vibrators for phones, Precision Gearheads, Medical equipment, Watch exterior parts
- Number of employees: 500 (Japan)[2,000(consolidated group)]
- Website: namiki.net orbray.com/special/en/

Namiki Precision Jewel Co., Ltd. (並木精密宝石株式会社, Namiki Seimitu Houseki Kabushiki-gaisha) is a Japanese component manufacturing company based in Tokyo, Japan. The company was founded in 1939 as a manufacturer of synthetic sapphire jewel bearings for electrical measuring instruments. Namiki supplies industrial jewel parts, dc coreless and dc brushless motors, multi-functional vibration components, precision gearheads, medical equipment, watch exterior parts, Analog Record-related Products and other precision components.
Namiki merged with its affiliated company, Adamant Co., Ltd. on January 1, 2018, and changed its name to Adamant Namiki Precision Jewel Co., Ltd. Adamant Namiki Precision Jewel Co., Ltd., and Akita Adamant Co., Ltd., merged in 2023 and the company was rebranded as Orbray Co., Ltd., on January 1, 2023.

== Products ==
=== Jewel Parts ===
Namiki supplies industrial jewel parts such as jewel bearings, phonograph diamond styli and cantilevers, watch exterior parts, and sapphire wafers which are made of synthetic sapphire which is produced in-house. They have developed sapphire step wafers, with a step height of 0.22 nanometres, which are expected to become the height standard for scanning probe microscopy (SPM), plus Immobilization plates for observing bio-materials.

=== DC Motors ===
Namiki supplies DC coreless motors, DC brushless motors and geared motors. In 2004, they developed the world's smallest micro geared motor (diameter 1.5mm) for use in medical equipment, (catheters, endoscopes) and Micro-robots.

=== Diaphragm Pumps ===
Namiki supplies diaphragm liquid and air pumps used in inkjet printers and biotechnology devices including incubation systems.

=== Vibration Components ===
Namiki vibration motors and multi-functional vibration speakers combining speaker, receiver, and vibration functions, are used in mobile phones.
