= Shock-resistant watch =

Watch that copes with mechanical shocks

Shock resistant is a common mark stamped on the back of wrist watches to indicate how well a watch copes with mechanical shocks. In a mechanical watch, it indicates that the delicate pivots that hold the balance wheel are mounted in a spring suspension system intended to protect them from damage if the watch is dropped. One of the earliest and most widely used was the Incabloc system, invented in 1934. Before the widespread adoption of shock-resistant balance pivots in the 1950s, broken balance wheel staffs were a common cause of watch repairs.

== Usage ==
Virtually all mechanical watches produced today are shock resistant. Even divers' watches (according to ISO 6425) must correspond not only with such criteria as water resistance, luminosity, magnetic resistance and strap solidity, but also shock resistance.

=== ISO 1413 shock-resistant standard ===
The International Organization for Standardization issued a standard for shock-resistant watches, which many countries have adopted. ISO 1413 Horology—Shock-resistant watches specifies the minimum requirements and describes the corresponding method of test. It is intended to allow homologation tests rather than the individual control of all watches of a production batch. It is based on the simulation of the shock received by a watch on falling accidentally from a height of 1 m on to a horizontal hardwood surface.

In practice shock resistance is generally tested by applying two shocks (one on the 9 o'clock side, and one to the crystal and perpendicular to the face). The shock is usually delivered by a hard plastic hammer mounted as a pendulum, so as to deliver a measured amount of energy, specifically, a 3 kg hammer with an impact velocity of 4.43 m/s (This will deliver approximately 3.7 Joules of energy to the watch). The peak acceleration delivered to the watch head is 3100g ± 15%, in sinusoidal form, over 350 microseconds. After the first shock the displacement of the hands (started from 'noon') must be < 5mins. After the second shock, the watch must keep its accuracy to ± 60 seconds/day after these two shocks as compared to before the test. A third shock is then applied onto the crown side. Nothing should be bent or broken. There is also a 'free-fall' test for the complete watch. First it is dropped crown up clasp open. Second, it is dropped on it case back. In the case of deployant clasps, they are opened but continuous under the watch. In both cases a trap door is used to drop the watch onto a surface calibrated to deliver the same shock profile as in the impact tests above. No components should be broken or lost in the free-fall tests.

== See also ==
- Watch
- Diving watch
- Trench watch
- Magnetic-resistant watch
- Water-resistant watch
- Incabloc shock protection system
- G-Shock
