= Incabloc shock protection system =

Spring to protect bearings in watches

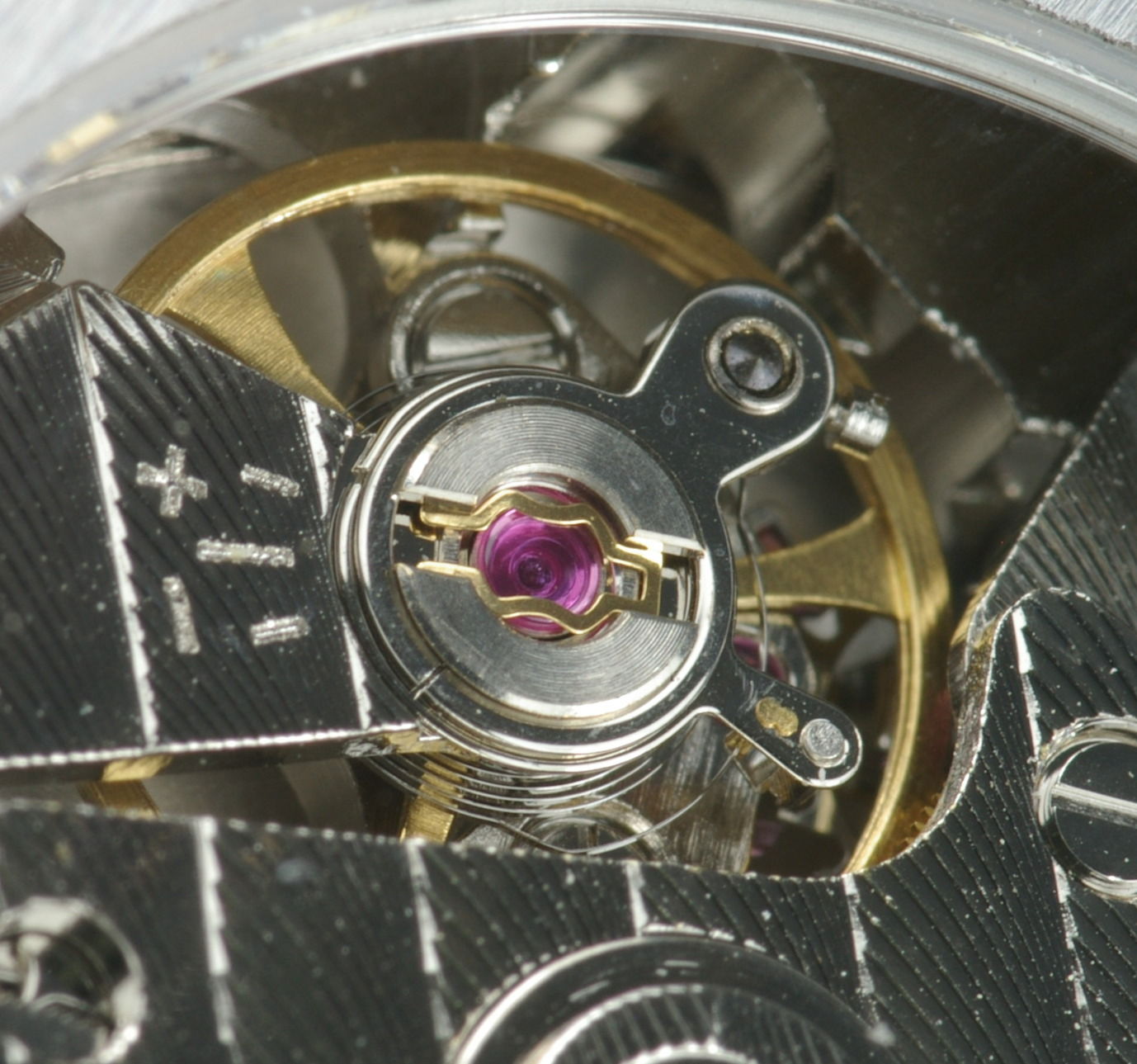
Jewel bearing of a balance wheel, supported by a lyre-shaped spring

The Incabloc shock protection system is the trade name for a spring-loaded mounting system for the jewel bearings that support the balance wheel in a mechanical watch, to protect the wheel's delicate pivots from damage in the event of physical shock, such as if the watch is dropped.

== History ==
The Incabloc system was invented in 1934 by Swiss engineers Georges Braunschweig and Fritz Marti, at Universal Escapements, Ltd, of La Chaux-de-Fonds, Switzerland. It is manufactured by Incabloc, S.A. Similar systems are ETA's Etachoc, Kif, Seiko's Diashock, and Citizen's Parashock.

The pivots and jewel bearings that support a watch balance wheel are fragile in comparison to the mass they must support, and without shock protection are the part of the watch most likely to be damaged under impact. Before the widespread use of shock protection devices like Incabloc, broken balance staffs were a common type of damage requiring watch repair.

The Incabloc system uses a "lyre-shaped" spring to allow the delicate bearings to shift in their settings under impact, until a stronger shoulder of the staff contacts the strong metal endpiece, so that the pivots and bearings don't have to bear the force of the impact. When the impact is over, the springs guide the parts back to their original positions. The staff itself does not move relative to the jewel bearing, but the whole bearing is carried in a metal bushing that is free to move in the metal endpiece, under the control of the spring. Some modern balance wheels use a simpler arrangement, where, taking advantage of the low cost of modern synthetic rubies, a large jewel moves as its own mobile bushing.

== See also ==
- Cushioning
- Shock-resistant watch
