= MIL-PRF-38534 =

The MIL-PRF-38534 specification establishes the general performance requirements for hybrid microcircuits (hybrid integrated circuit), multi-chip modules (MCM) and, similar devices and the verification and validation requirements for ensuring that these devices meet the applicable performance requirements. Verification is accomplished through the use of one of two quality programs. The main body of this specification describes the performance requirements and the requirements for obtaining a Qualified Manufacturers List (QML) listing. The appendices of this specification are intended for guidance to aid a manufacturer in developing their verification program. Detail requirements, specific characteristics, and other provisions that are sensitive to the particular intended use should be specified in the applicable device acquisition specification.

The intent of this specification is to allow the device manufacturer the flexibility to implement best commercial practices to the maximum extent possible while still providing a product which meets the military performance needs. Devices that are compliant to this specification are those that are capable of meeting the verification requirements outlined herein; and are built on a manufacturing line which is controlled by the manufacturer's quality management program and has been certified and qualified in accordance with the requirements herein. The certification and qualification requirements outlined herein are the requirements to be met by a manufacturer to be listed on the QML. The manufacturer may modify, substitute or delete the tests and inspections defined herein. This is accomplished by baselining a flow of tests and inspections that will assure that the devices are capable of meeting the generic verifications provided in this specification. This does not necessarily mean that compliant devices have been subjected to the generic performance verifications provided in this specification, just that compliant devices are capable of meeting them. It is the manufacturer's responsibility to ensure that their devices are capable of meeting the generic performance verifications applicable to each specified product assurance level.

== References and external links ==
- "MIL-PRF-38534H, PERFORMANCE SPECIFICATION: HYBRID MICROCIRCUITS, GENERAL SPECIFICATION FOR" (PDF). United States Department of Defense. 13 Sep 2010.
- "MIL-PRF-38534G, PERFORMANCE SPECIFICATION: HYBRID MICROCIRCUITS, GENERAL SPECIFICATION FOR" (PDF). United States Department of Defense. 9 Mar 2009.
- "MIL-PRF-38534F, PERFORMANCE SPECIFICATION: HYBRID MICROCIRCUITS, GENERAL SPECIFICATION FOR" (PDF). United States Department of Defense. 12 Apr 2006.
- "MIL-PRF-38534E, PERFORMANCE SPECIFICATION: HYBRID MICROCIRCUITS, GENERAL SPECIFICATION FOR" (PDF). United States Department of Defense. 6 Jan 2003.
- "MIL-PRF-38534D, PERFORMANCE SPECIFICATION: HYBRID MICROCIRCUITS, GENERAL SPECIFICATION FOR" (PDF). United States Department of Defense. 6 Jan 1999.
- Defense Supply Center, Columbus - General Specification for Hybrid Microcircuits
