= Printed electronic circuit =

A printed electronic circuit (PEC) was an ancestor of the hybrid integrated circuit (IC). PECs were common in tube (valve) equipment from the 1940s through the 1970s.

== Brands ==
Couplate was the Centralab trademark, whilst Sprague called them BulPlates. Aerovox used the generic PEC.

== Difference from hybrid integrated circuits ==
PECs contained only resistors and capacitors arranged in circuits to simplify construction of tube equipment. Also, their voltage ratings were suitable for tubes. Later, hybrid ICs contained transistors, and often monolithic integrated circuits. Their voltage ratings were suitable for the transistors they contained.
