= Water Resistant mark =

Common mark stamped on the back of watches

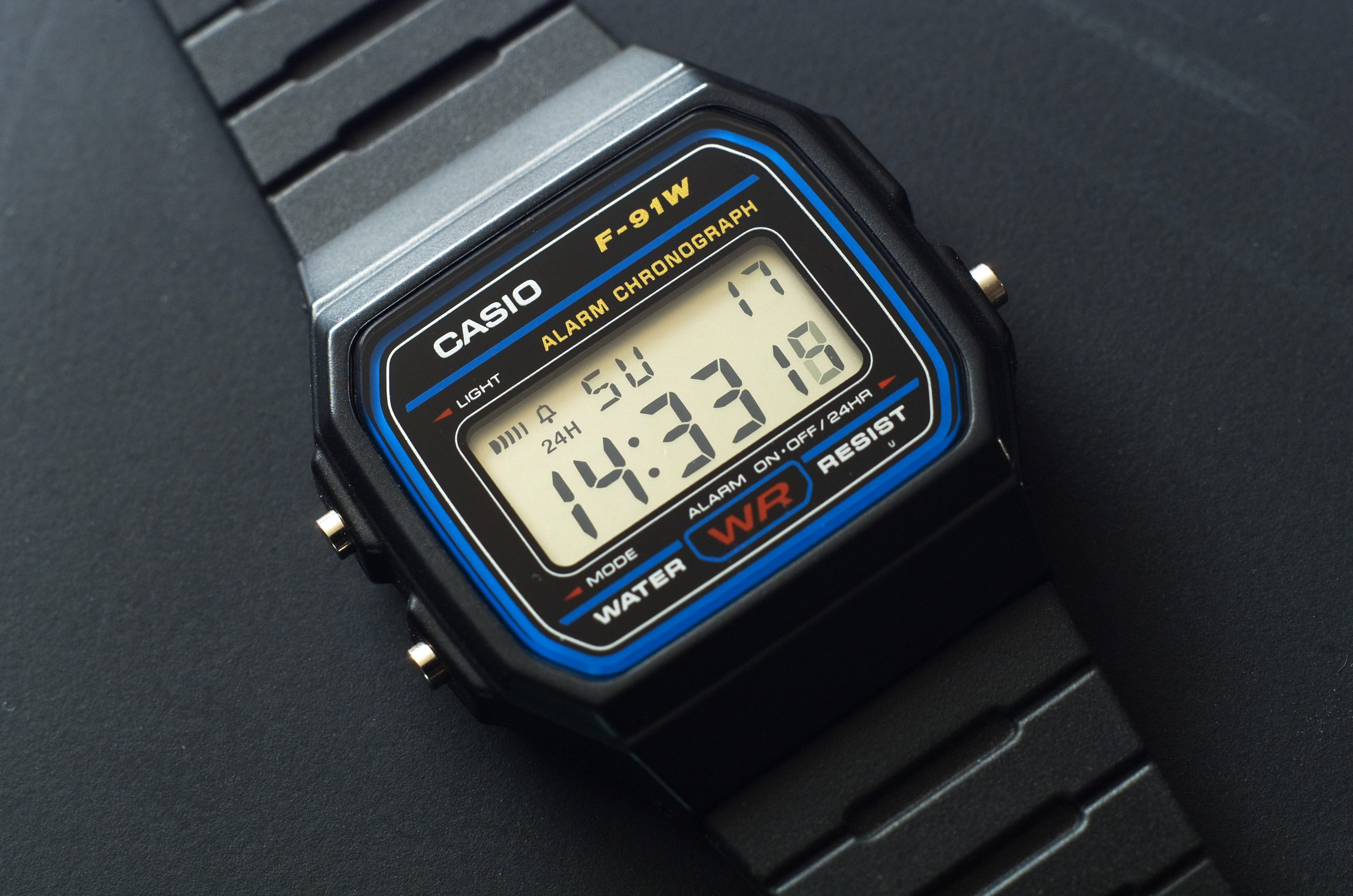
Water Resist marking on the front of the Casio F-91W wristwatch

Water Resistant is a common mark stamped on the back of wrist watches to indicate how well a watch is sealed against the ingress of water. It is usually accompanied by an indication of the static test pressure that a sample of newly manufactured watches were exposed to in a leakage test. The test pressure can be indicated either directly in units of pressure such as bar, atmospheres, or (more commonly) as an equivalent water depth in metres (in the United States sometimes also in feet).

An indication of the test pressure in terms of water depth does not mean a water-resistant watch was designed for repeated long-term use in such water depths. For example, a watch marked 30 metres water resistant cannot be expected to withstand activity for longer time periods in a swimming pool, let alone continue to function at 30 metres under water. This is because the test is conducted only once using static pressure on a sample of newly manufactured watches. As only a small sample is tested, there is a small likelihood that any individual watch is not water resistant to the certified depth or even at all.

The test for qualifying a diving watch to bear the word "diver's" on the dial is for repeated usage in a given depth and includes safety margins to take factors into account like aging of the seals, the properties of water and seawater, rapidly changing water pressure and temperature, as well as dynamic mechanical stresses encountered by a watch. Every "diver's" badged watch has to be taken through a small but highly specified battery of tests designed to simulate those stresses including being tested for continued water resistance up to 125% of the stated rating (a "200 meter" watch has to be pressured up to 250 meters water depth equivalent and show no signs of intrusion).

== ISO 2281 water-resistant watches standard ==
The International Organization for Standardization (ISO) issued a standard for water-resistant watches which also prohibits the term waterproof to be used with watches, which many countries have adopted. This standard was introduced in 1990 as the ISO 2281:1990 and only designed for watches intended for ordinary daily use and are resistant to water during exercises such as swimming for a short period. They may be used under conditions where water pressure and temperature vary; German Industrial Norm DIN 8310 is an equivalent standard. However, whether they bear an additional indication of overpressure or not, they are not intended for submarine diving.

The ISO 2281 standard specifies a detailed testing procedure for each mark that defines not only pressures but also test duration, water temperature, and other parameters. Besides this ISO 2859-2 Sampling plans indexed by limiting quality (LQ) for isolated lot inspection and ISO 2859-3 Sampling procedures for inspection by attributes – Part 3: Skip-lot sampling procedures concerning procedures regarding lot sampling testing come into play, since not every single watch has to be tested for ISO 2281 approval.

ISO 2281 water resistance testing of a watch consists of:

- Resistance when immersed in water at a depth of 10 cm. Immersion of the watch in 10 cm of water for 1 hour.
- Resistance of operative parts. Immersion of the watch in 10 cm of water with a force of 5 N perpendicular to the crown and pusher buttons (if any) for 10 minutes.
- Condensation test. The watch shall be placed on a heated plate at a temperature between 40 °C and 45 °C until the watch has reached the temperature of the heated plate (in practice, a heating time of 10 minutes to 20 minutes, depending on the type of watch, will be sufficient). A drop of water, at a temperature between 18 °C and 25 °C shall be placed on the glass of the watch. After about 1 minute, the glass shall be wiped with a dry rag. Any watch which has condensation on the interior surface of the glass shall be eliminated.
- Resistance to different temperatures. Immersion of the watch in 10 cm of water at the following temperatures for 5 minutes each, 40 °C, 20 °C and 40 °C again, with the transition between temperatures not to exceed 1 minute. No evidence of water intrusion or condensation is allowed.
- Resistance to water overpressure. Immersion of the watch in a suitable pressure vessel and subjecting it within 1 minute to the rated pressure for 10 minutes, or to 2 bar in case where no additional indication is given. Then the overpressure is reduced to the ambient pressure within 1 minute. No evidence of water intrusion or condensation is allowed.
- Resistance to air overpressure. Exposing the watch to an overpressure of 2 bar. The watch shall show no air-flow exceeding 50 μg/min.
- No magnetic or shock resistance properties are required.
- No negative pressure test is required.
- No strap attachment test is required.
- No corrosion test is required.

Except the thermal shock resistance test all further ISO 2281 testing should be conducted at 18 °C to 25 °C temperature. Regarding pressure ISO 2281 defines: 1 bar = 10^{5} Pa = 10^{5} N/m^{2}.

This has since been replaced by the ISO 22810:2010 standard, which covers all activities up to specified depth and clears up ambiguities with the previous standard.

In practice, the survivability of the watch will depend not only on the water depth, but also on the age of the sealing material, past damage, temperature, and additional mechanical stresses.

== ISO 6425 divers' watches standard ==
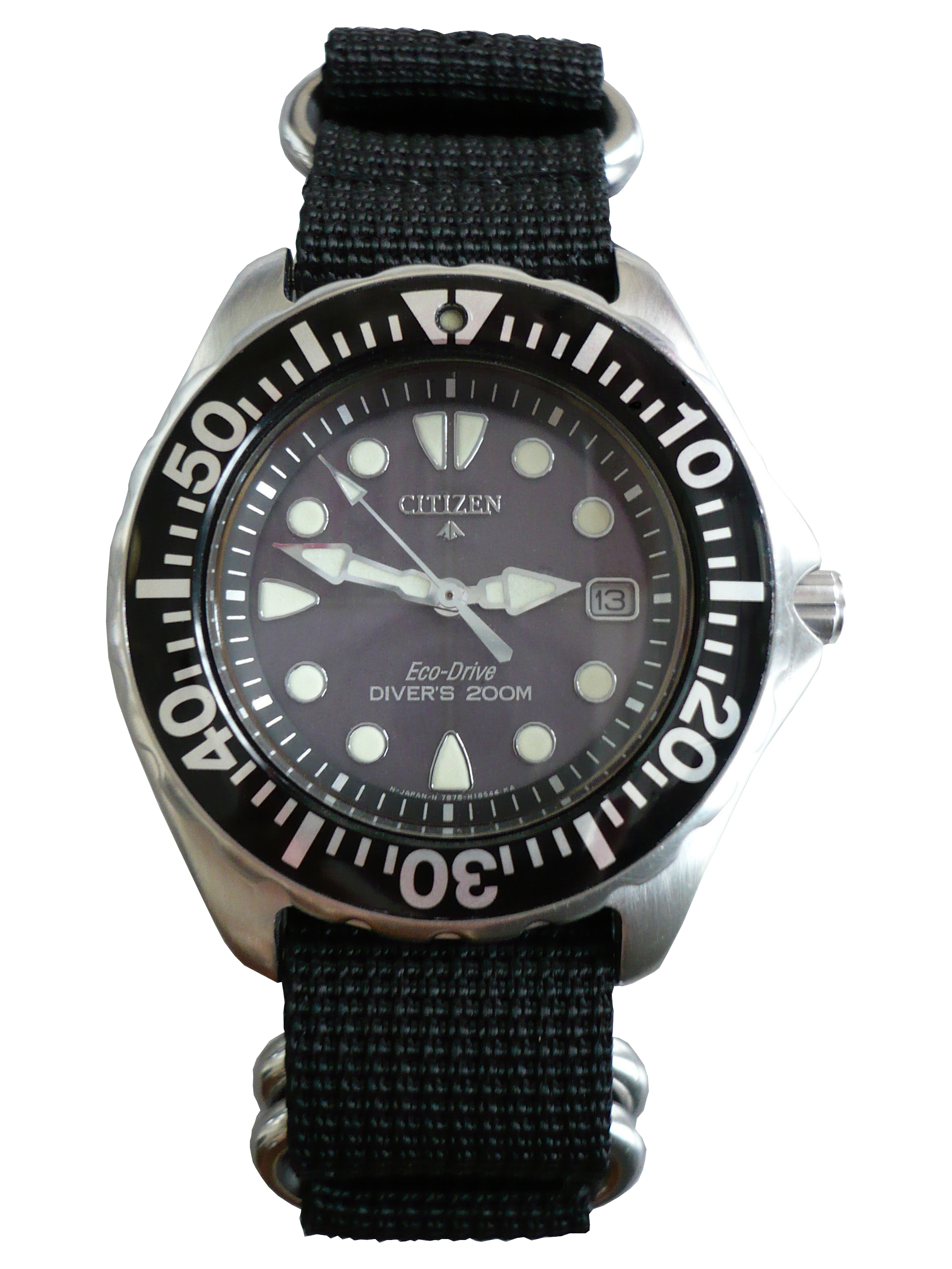
ISO 6425 compliant DIVER'S 200M marked diving watch

The standards and features for diving watches are regulated by the ISO 6425 – Divers' watches international standard. This standard was introduced in 1996. ISO 6425 defines such watches as: A watch designed to withstand diving in water at depths of at least 100 m and possessing a system to control the time. Diving watches are tested in static or still water under 125% of the rated (water) pressure, thus a watch with a 200-metre rating will be water resistant if it is stationary and under 250 metres of static water. ISO 6425 testing of the water resistance or water-tightness and resistance at a water overpressure as it is officially defined is fundamentally different from non-dive watches, because every single watch has to be tested. Testing diving watches for ISO 6425 compliance is voluntary and involves costs, so not every manufacturer present their watches for certification according to this standard.

ISO 6425 testing of a diver's watch consists of:

- Reliability under water. The watches under test shall be immersed in water to a depth of 30±2 cm for 50 hours at 18 to 25 °C and all the mechanisms shall still function correctly. The condensation test shall be carried out before and after this test to ensure that the result is related to the above test.
- Condensation test. The watch shall be placed on a heated plate at a temperature between 40 and 45 °C until the watch has reached the temperature of the heated plate (in practice, a heating time of 10 minutes to 20 minutes, depending on the type of watch, will be sufficient). A drop of water, at a temperature of 18 to 25 °C shall be placed on the glass of the watch. After about 1 minute, the glass shall be wiped with a dry rag. Any watch which has condensation on the interior surface of the glass shall be eliminated.
- Resistance of crowns and other setting devices to an external force. The watches under test shall be subjected to an overpressure in water of 125% of the rated pressure for 10 minutes and to an external force of 5 N perpendicular to the crown and pusher buttons (if any). The condensation test shall be carried out before and after this test to ensure that the result is related to the above test.
- Water-tightness and resistance at a water overpressure. The watches under test shall be immersed in water contained in a suitable vessel. Then an overpressure of 125% of the rated pressure shall be applied within 1 minute and maintained for 2 hours. Subsequently, the overpressure shall be reduced to 0.3 bar within 1 minute and maintained at this pressure for 1 hour. The watches shall then be removed from the water and dried with a rag. No evidence of water intrusion or condensation is allowed.
- Resistance to thermal shock. Immersion of the watch in 30±2 cm of water at the following temperatures for 10 minutes each, 40 °C, 5 °C and 40 °C again. The time of transition from one immersion to the other shall not exceed 1 minute. No evidence of water intrusion or condensation is allowed.
- An optional test originating from the ISO 2281 tests (but not required for obtaining ISO 6425 approval) is exposing the watch to an overpressure of 200 kPa. The watch shall show no air-flow exceeding 50 μg/min.

Except the thermal shock resistance test all further ISO 6425 testing should be conducted at 18 to 25 °C temperature. Regarding pressure ISO 6425 defines: 1 bar = 10^{5} Pa = 10^{5} N/m^{2}. The required 125% test pressure provides a safety margin against dynamic pressure increase events, water density variations (seawater is 2% to 5% denser than freshwater) and degradation of the seals.

Movement induced dynamic pressure increase is sometimes the subject of urban myths and marketing arguments for diver's watches with high water resistance ratings. When a diver makes a fast swimming movement of 10 m/s (33 ft/s) (the best competitive swimmers and finswimmers do not move their hands nor swim that fast) physics dictates that the diver generates a dynamic pressure of 50 kPa or the equivalent of 5 metres of additional water depth.

Besides water resistance standards to a minimum of 100 metres (330 ft) depth rating ISO 6425 also provides minimum requirements for mechanical diver's watches (quartz and digital watches have slightly differing readability requirements) such as:

- The presence of a time-preselecting device, for example a unidirectional rotating bezel or a digital display. Such a device shall be protected against inadvertent rotation or wrong manipulation. If it is a rotating bezel, it shall have a minute scale going up to 60 min. The markings on the dial, if existing, shall be coordinated with those of the preselecting device and shall be clearly visible. If the preselecting device is a digital display, it shall be clearly visible.
- The following items of the watch shall be legible at a distance of 25 cm (9.8 in) in the dark:
  - time (the minute hand shall be clearly distinguishable from the hour hand);
  - set time of the time-preselecting device;
  - indication that the watch is running (This is usually indicated by a running second hand with a luminous tip or tail.);
  - in the case of battery-powered watches, a battery end-of-life indication.
- The presence of an indication that the watch is running in total darkness. This is usually indicated by a running second hand with a luminous tip or tail.
- Magnetic resistance. This is tested by 3 expositions to a direct current magnetic field of 4 800 A/m. The watch must keep its accuracy to ±30 seconds/day as measured before the test despite the magnetic field.
- Shock resistance. This is tested by two shocks (one on the 9 o'clock side, and one to the crystal and perpendicular to the face). The shock is usually delivered by a hard plastic hammer mounted as a pendulum, so as to deliver a measured amount of energy, specifically, a 3 kg hammer with an impact velocity of 4.43 m/s. The change in rate allowed is ±60 seconds/day.
- Resistance to salty water. The watches under test shall be put in a 30 g/L NaCl (sodium chloride) solution and kept there for 24 hours at 18 to 25 °C. This test water solution has salinity comparable to normal seawater. After this test, the case and accessories shall be examined for any possible changes. Moving parts, particularly the rotating bezel, shall be checked for correct functioning.
- Resistance of attachments to an external force (strap/band solidity). This is tested by applying a force of 200 N (45 lb_{f}) to each springbar (or attaching point) in opposite directions with no damage to the watch of attachment point. The bracelet of the watch being tested shall be closed.
- Marking. Watches conforming to ISO 6425 are marked with the word DIVER'S WATCH xxx M or DIVER'S xxx M to distinguish diving watches from look-a-like watches that are not suitable for actual scuba diving. The letters xxx are replaced by the diving depth, in metres, guaranteed by the manufacturer.

=== Diver's watches for mixed-gas diving ===
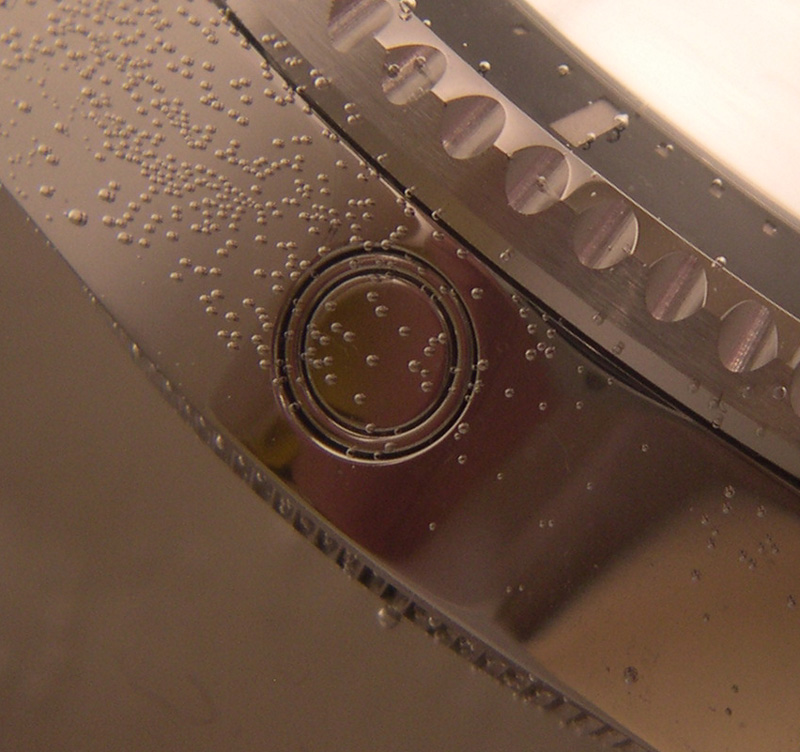
Integrated helium release valve releasing breathing gas from the watch case. This feature is found in some mixed-gas diving watches to prevent the crystal from popping off during decompression.

Diving at a great depth and for a long period is done in a diving chamber, with the (saturation) diver spending time alternately in the water and in a pressurized environment, breathing a gas mixture. In this case, the watch is subjected to the pressure of the gas mixture and its functioning can be disturbed. Consequently, it is recommended to subject the watch to a special extra test. ISO 6425 defines a diver's watch for mixed-gas diving as: A watch required to be resistant during diving in water to a depth of at least 100 m and to be unaffected by the overpressure of the mixed gas used for breathing.

The following specific additional requirements for testing of diver's watches for mixed-gas diving are provided by ISO 6425:

- Test of operation at a gas overpressure. The watch is subject to the overpressure of gas which will actually be used, i.e. 125% of the rated pressure, for 15 days. Then a rapid reduction in pressure to the atmospheric pressure shall be carried out in a time not exceeding 3 minutes. After this test, the watch shall function correctly. An electronic watch shall function normally during and after the test. A mechanical watch shall function normally after the test (the power reserve normally being less than 15 days).
- Test by internal pressure (simulation of decompression). Remove the crown together with the winding and/or setting stem. In its place, fit a crown of the same type with a hole. Through this hole, introduce the gas mixture which will actually be used and create an overpressure of the rated pressure/20 bar in the watch for a period of 10 hours. Then carry out the test at the rated water overpressure. In this case, the original crown with the stem shall be refitted beforehand. After this test, the watch shall function correctly.
- Marking. Watches used for mix-gas diving which satisfy the test requirements are marked with the words "DIVER'S WATCH xxx M FOR MIXED-GAS DIVING". The letters xxx are replaced by the diving depth, in metres, guaranteed by the manufacturer. The composition of the gas mixture used for the test shall be given in the operating instructions accompanying the watch.

Most manufacturers recommend divers to have their diving watch pressure tested by an authorized service and repair facility annually or every two to three years and have the seals replaced.

== Water resistance classification ==
Watches are often classified by watch manufacturers by their degree of water resistance which, due to the absence of official classification standards, roughly translates to the following (1 metre ≈ 3.29 feet). These vagueries have since been superseded by ISO 22810:2010, in which "any watch on the market sold as water-resistant must satisfy ISO 22810 – regardless of the brand."

Water resistance rating	Suitability	Remarks
Water Resistant 3 atm or 30 m	Suitable for everyday use. Splash/rain resistant.	Not suitable for showering, bathing, swimming, snorkeling, water related work, fishing, and diving.
Water Resistant 5 atm or 50 m	Suitable for everyday use, showering, bathing, shallow-water swimming, snorkeling, water related work, fishing. Splash/rain resistant.	Not suitable for diving.
Water Resistant 10 atm or 100 m	Suitable for recreational surfing, swimming, snorkeling, sailing and water sports.	Not suitable for diving.
Water Resistant 20 atm or 200 m	Suitable for professional marine activity, serious surface water sports and skin diving.	Suitable for skin diving.
Diver's 100 m	Minimum ISO standard (ISO 6425) for scuba diving at depths not suitable for saturation diving.	Diver's 100 m and 150 m watches are generally old(er) watches.
Diver's 200 m or 300 m	Suitable for scuba diving at depths not suitable for saturation diving.	Typical ratings for contemporary diver's watches.
Diver's 300^{+} m for mixed-gas diving	Suitable for saturation diving (helium enriched environment).	Watches designed for mixed-gas diving will have the DIVER'S WATCH xxx M FOR MIXED-GAS DIVING additional marking to point this out.

== See also ==
- IP code
- Certified chronometer
