= Aquos Phone Xx 106SH =

2012 smartphone model

AQUOS PHONE Xx 106SH
- Brand: SoftBank Mobile
- Manufacturer: Sharp
- Type: Smartphone
- Series: AQUOS PHONE
- First released: July 6, 2012; 14 years ago
- Compatible networks: SoftBank 3G (W-CDMA, 900 MHz Platinum Band); GSM
- Form factor: Slate
- Colors: Radiant White; Black
- Dimensions: 130 mm (5.1 in) H 67 mm (2.6 in) W 10.8 mm (0.43 in) D
- Weight: 147 g (5.2 oz)
- Operating system: Android 4.0
- System-on-chip: Qualcomm Snapdragon S4 MSM8260A
- CPU: 1.5 GHz dual-core
- Memory: 1 GB RAM
- Storage: 32 GB ROM
- Removable storage: microSD (up to 2 GB) microSDHC (up to 32 GB) microSDXC (up to 64 GB)
- Battery: 1900 mAh
- Rear camera: 12.1 MP back-illuminated CMOS, HD 1080p video recording, image stabilization, face detection
- Front camera: 0.3 MP CMOS
- Display: 4.7 in Super CG Silicon, 1280×720 pixels (HD), 16.77 million colors
- Water resistance: Waterproof / Dustproof
- Model: 106SH

The AQUOS PHONE Xx 106SH is a 3G smartphone manufactured by Sharp and distributed by SoftBank Mobile. Operating on Android 4.0, it serves as a flagship device within the AQUOS PHONE lineup. The product name "Xx" stands for "extreme excellence."

Unlike other flagship models in the AQUOS PHONE series, the 106SH features ULTRA SPEED (DC-HSDPA) connectivity alongside support for SoftBank's 900 MHz "Platinum Band" network, and includes 32 GB of internal storage.

== History ==
- May 29, 2012 – Officially announced by SoftBank Mobile.
- July 6, 2012 – Released for sale.

== Specifications ==
=== Hardware ===
The device features a 4.7-inch HD Super CG Silicon display with a resolution of 1280×720 pixels, capable of displaying 16.77 million colors. It is powered by a 1.5 GHz dual-core Qualcomm Snapdragon S4 MSM8260A processor, paired with 1 GB of RAM and 32 GB of internal storage, expandable up to 64 GB via microSDXC.

The primary rear camera utilizes a 12.1-megapixel back-illuminated CMOS sensor capable of 1080p video recording, image stabilization, and face detection, while the front camera uses a 0.3-megapixel CMOS sensor. Additional features include a 1900 mAh battery, a slate form factor, IPX5/IPX7 water resistance, dust resistance, FeliCa (Osaifu-Keitai), infrared communication (IrDA), and 1-seg TV tuning. Connectivity options include DC-HSDPA (up to 42 Mbps download), Wi-Fi (IEEE 802.11b/g/n), Bluetooth 3.0, and GPS.

=== Software ===
The smartphone runs on the Android 4.0 operating system with the iWnn Japanese input system and Feel UX. Pre-installed applications include Google services such as Google Play, Google Maps, Google Talk, Google Voice Search, Google+, and YouTube, alongside manufacturer and carrier apps like SH SHOW, GALAPAGOS STORE, Smart Security powered by McAfee, Internet SagiWall, Content Guide, Machiuta, and Viewn.

== Known issues ==
- On August 21, 2012, SoftBank released a software update to fix an issue where the web browser would unexpectedly force close.
