= Laser trimming =

Electronic circuit manufacturing method

Laser trimming is the manufacturing process of using a laser to adjust the operating parameters of an electronic circuit.

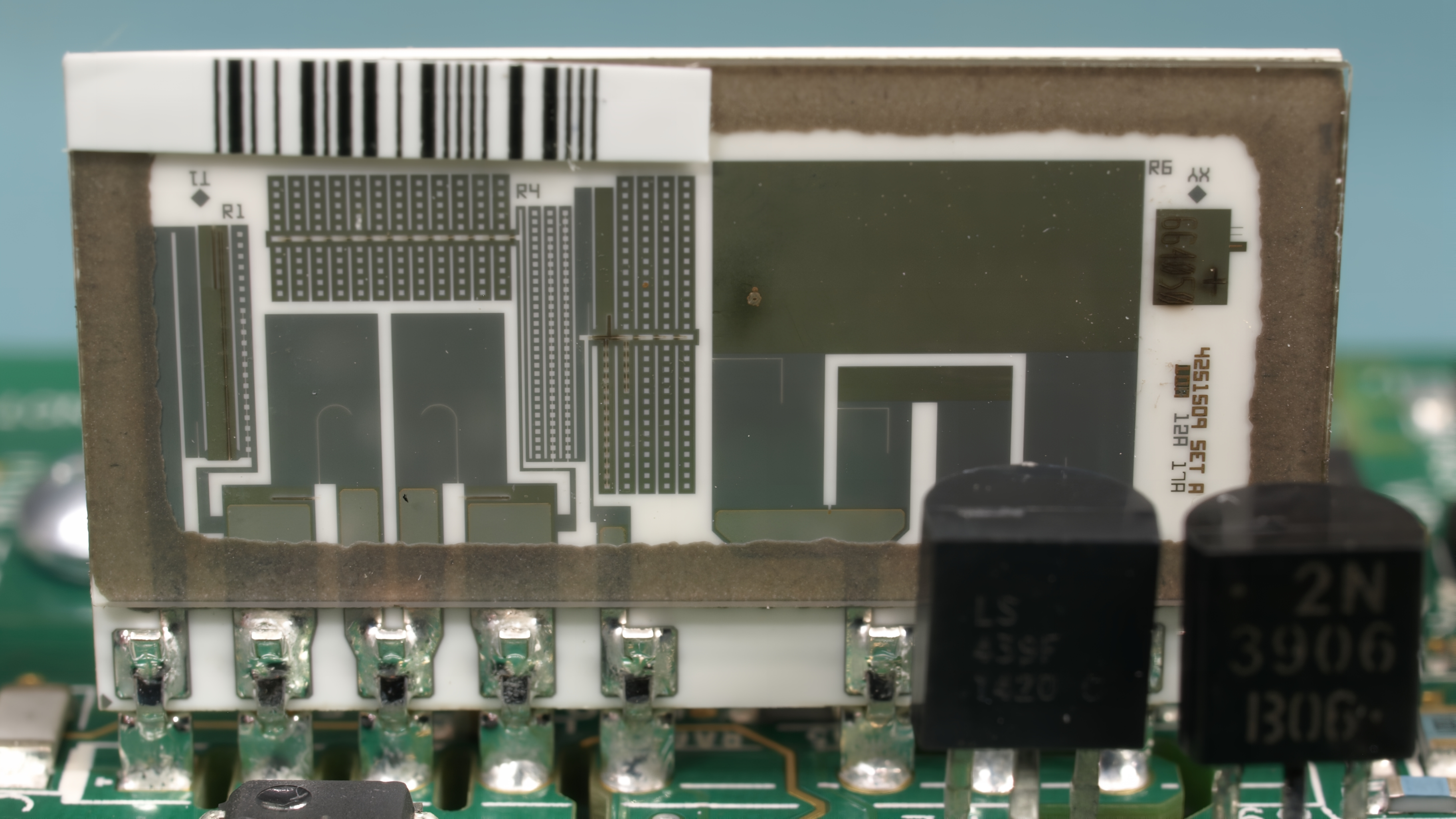
Laser-trimmed precision thin-film resistor network from Fluke, used in the Keithley DMM7510 multimeter. Ceramic backed with glass hermetic seal cover. Laser trim marks are visible in the grey resistive material.

One of the most common applications uses a laser to burn away small portions of resistors, raising their resistance value. The burning operation can be conducted while the circuit is being tested by automatic test equipment, leading to optimum final values for the resistor(s) in the circuit.

The resistance value of a film resistor is defined by its geometric dimensions (length, width, height) and the resistor material. A lateral cut in the resistor material by the laser narrows or lengthens the current flow path and increases the resistance value. The same effect is obtained whether the laser changes a thick-film or a thin-film resistor on a ceramic substrate or a surface-mount resistor. The surface-mount resistor is produced with the same technology and may be laser trimmed as well.

Trimmable chip capacitors are built up as multilayer plate capacitors. Vaporizing part of the top layer with a laser decreases the capacitance by reducing the area of the top electrode.

Passive trim is the adjustment of a resistor to a given value. If the trimming adjusts the whole circuit output such as output voltage, frequency, or switching threshold, this is called active trim. During the trim process, the corresponding parameter is measured continuously and compared to the programmed nominal value. The laser stops automatically when the value reaches the nominal value.

== Trimming LTCC resistances in a pressure chamber ==
One type of passive trimmer uses a pressure chamber to enable resistor trimming in a single run. The LTCC boards are contacted by test probes on the assembly side and trimmed with a laser beam from the resistor side. This trimming method requires no contact points between the resistances, because the fine pitch adapter contacts the component on the opposite side of where the trimming occurs. Therefore, the LTCC can be arranged more compactly and less expensively.

High speed R-Laser Trimmer with a pressure chamber

Function mode:

- The LTCC is mounted in the contact unit.
- From the opposite side a rigid probe contacts the circuit.
- From the top side the chamber is pressurized to 1 to 4 bars, with a controlled exhaust port to achieve air flow through the chamber.
- As the resistance material is vaporized, the waste particles are removed in the air flow.

Advantages of this method:

- Trimming of unlimited number of printed resistors in one step without obstruction from test probes.
- No contamination on board, adapter or in system.
- Density up to 280 points/cm².

== Trimming potentiometers ==
Often designers use potentiometers, which are adjusted during end testing until the desired function of the circuit is reached. In many applications, the end user of the product would prefer not to have potentiometers, as they can drift, be mis-adjusted or develop noise. Therefore, manufacturers determine the needed resistance or capacitance values by measurement and calculation methods and afterwards solder the suitable component into the final PCB; this approach is called "Select on Test" (SOT) and is quite labor-intensive.

It is simpler to substitute the potentiometer or the SOT part with a trimmable chip resistor or chip capacitor, and the potentiometer adjusting screwdriver is replaced by the laser trimming. The achieved accuracy can be higher, the procedure can be automated, and the long-term stability is better than with potentiometers and at least as good as with SOT components. Often the laser for active trimming can be integrated in existing measurement systems by the manufacturer.

== Program from digital logic circuits ==
A similar approach can be used to program digital logic circuits. In this case, fuses are blown by the laser, enabling or disabling various logic circuits. An example of this is the IBM POWER4 microprocessor where the chip contains five banks of cache memory but only requires four banks for full operation. During testing, each cache bank is exercised. If a defect is found in one bank, that bank can be disabled by blowing its programming fuse. This built-in redundancy allows higher chip yields than would be possible if all cache banks had to be perfect in every chip. If no bank is defective, a fuse can be blown arbitrarily, leaving just four banks.
