= Adamant Co., Ltd. =

Japanese component manufacturing company

- Native name: アダマンド株式会社
- Type: Kabushiki kaisha
- Founded: April 26, 1957
- Headquarters: Adachi, Tokyo, Japan
- Key people: Chairman and CEO: Shoji Namiki; President: Yoichi Shimoda
- Products: Photonics, fine industrial jewels, advanced materials

Adamant Co., Ltd. (アダマンド株式会社, Adamant Kabushiki-gaisha) is a component manufacturing company based in Tokyo, Japan. Its name is from the word adamant, which was derived from the Greek word adamas meaning "diamond". At its founding, Adamant's main products were watch jewels that were made of a hard material.

In 1957, Adamant separated from Namiki Precision Jewel Co., Ltd. It started sales of jewel bearings for watches and clocks and began to manufacture cap jewel, hole jewel, impulse jewel and pallet stone. In 1980, it started manufacturing ferrules for the optical communication industry utilizing injection molding engineering and polishing techniques.
Adamant merged with its parent company, Namiki Precision Jewel Co., Ltd., to establish Adamant Namiki Precision Jewel Co., Ltd. on January 1, 2018.

== History ==
- 1957 - Adamant Shoji Co., Ltd. was established.

Started sales of jewel bearings for watches and clocks.

- 1959 - The Company Changed name to Adamant Kogyo Co., Ltd.
- 1960 - Began to manufacture jewelled bearings for watches.
- 1967 - Akita Factory was set up at Yuzawa City, Akita.
- 1969 - Started manufacturing and sales of component parts for medical equipment.
- 1971 - Started manufacturing and sales of component parts

for telecommunication and applied electronic devices.

- 1976 - Started manufacturing and sales of phonograph parts
- 1978 - Started manufacturing and sales of optical equipment parts
- 1979 - Started manufacturing and sales of ruby capillaries
- 1980 - Started manufacturing and sales of ferrule
- 1981 - Started manufacturing and sales of sleeve
- 1983 - Started manufacturing and sales of high performance temperature/humidity sensors

and ruby surgical knives

- 1989 - Established Akita-Adamant Co., Ltd., a subsidiary of Adamant Kogyo Co., Ltd., was established at Yuzawa City, Akita.
- 1990 - Started manufacturing and sales of STN liquid crystal displays
- 1992 - Started manufacturing and sales of touch panels
- 1993 - Akita Adamant Co., Ltd. was moved to Yokote City, Akita
- 1996 - Akita Adamant Co., Ltd., obtained ISO 9001 certification
- 1998 - Adamant America, Inc., a subsidiary of Adamant Co., Ltd.

was established in United States.

- 2003 - In alliance with Micralyne to provide MEMS products.

Adamant group gained certification according to ISO 14001.

- 2009 - Adamant Europe GmbH, a subsidiary of Adamant Co., Ltd., was established in Germany.
- 2013 - Adamant Headquarters, Akita Adamant obtained ISO 13485 certification
- 2014 - The Company Changed name to Adamant Co., Ltd.
- 2018 - Adamant merged with its parent company, Namiki Precision Jewel Co., Ltd., to establish Adamant Namiki Precision Jewel Co., Ltd.

== Products ==
=== Photonics ===
Zirconia ferrule, sleeve, receptacle and connector incorporating Injection molding techniques. Lensed fiber, lens is formed on top of optical fiber which is equivalent with human hair.

=== MEMS (Micro Electro Mechanical System) ===
Started full foundry service covering development →test production →and OEM Manufacturing of MEMS in tie-ups with Micralyne Inc. in Canada.

Pursuant to joint development with Micralyne Inc. for optical sensor device incorporating MEMS.VOA（Variable Optical Attenuator）and optical switch with hermetically sealed in metal package

=== Fine industrial jewel ===
Capillaries for bonding tool, wedge, also, ruby knife, pellet, dental block for medical device, physics and chemistry.

=== Advanced material ===
Variety of color Ceramics available such as White, Black, Blue and Brown. Featuring glossy by polishing finish and a high-class touch. LTCC（Low Temperature Co-fired Ceramics） are co-fired at low temperature (900°C) in process which makes silver material possible in order to use as a conductor. Suited for RF products due to low loss. Also, multi-layered and flat substrate can be made easily. Highly accurate, high-density mounting are realized.
