= Co-fired ceramic =

Integrated circuit package made out of fired ceramic material

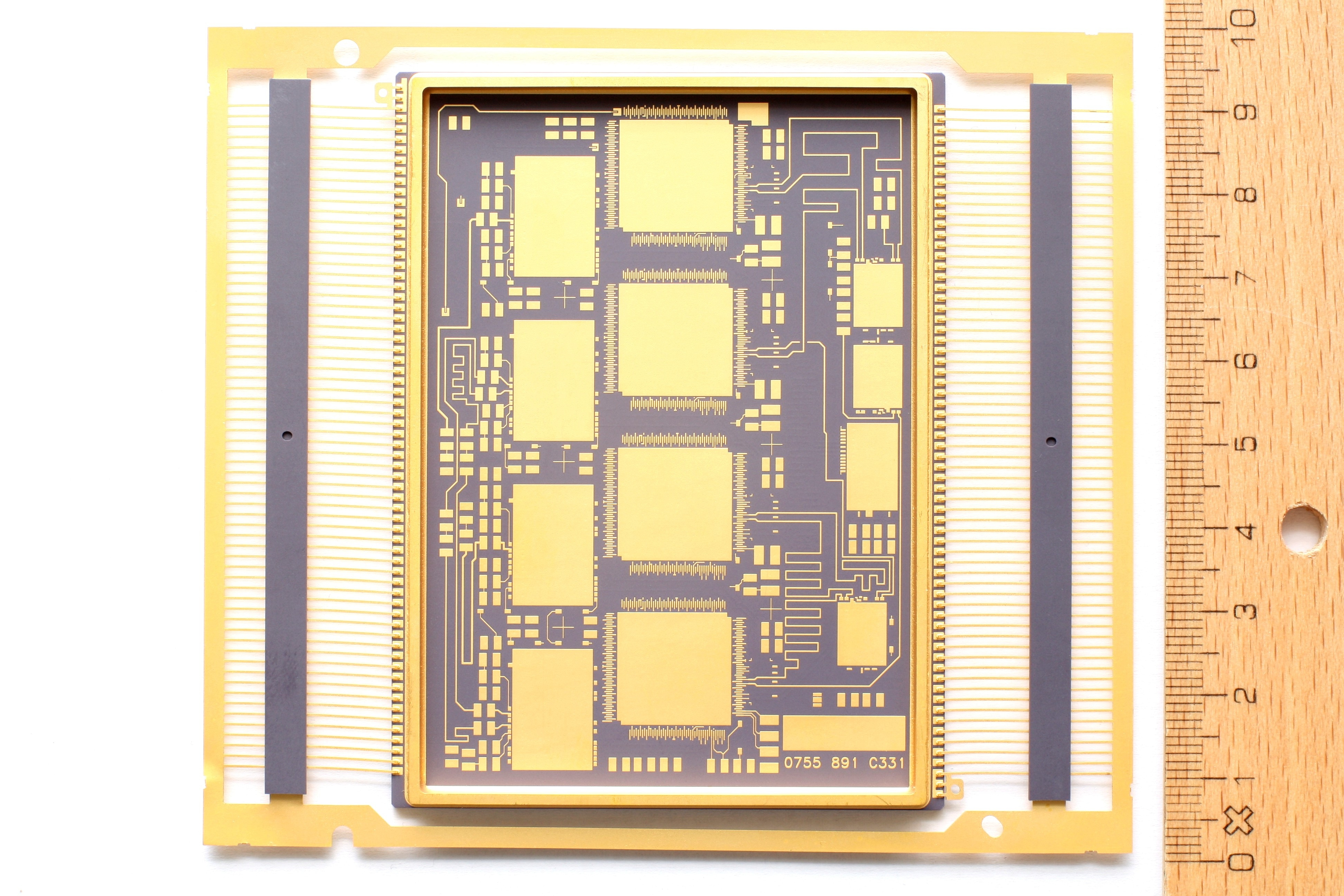
Unpopulated hybrid circuit (Low Temperature Cofired Ceramics)

Co-fired ceramic devices are monolithic, ceramic microelectronic devices where the entire ceramic support structure and any conductive, resistive, and dielectric materials are fired in a kiln at the same time. Typical devices include capacitors, inductors, resistors, transformers, and hybrid circuits. The technology is also used for robust assembly and packaging of electronic components multi-layer packaging in the electronics industry, such as military electronics, MEMS, microprocessor and RF applications.

Co-fired ceramic devices are fabricated using a multilayer approach. The starting material is composite green tapes, consisting of ceramic particles mixed with polymer binders. The tapes are flexible and can be machined, for example, using cutting, milling, punching and embossing. Metal structures can be added to the layers, commonly using filling and screen printing. Individual tapes are then bonded together in a lamination procedure before the devices are fired in a kiln, where the polymer part of the tape is combusted and the ceramic particles sinter together, forming a hard and dense ceramic component.

Co-firing can be divided into low-temperature (LTCC) and high-temperature (HTCC) applications: low temperature means that the sintering temperature is below 1,000 °C (1,830 °F), while high temperature is around 1,600 °C (2,910 °F). The lower sintering temperature for LTCC materials is made possible through the addition of a glassy phase to the ceramic, which lowers its melting temperature.

Due to a multilayer approach based on glass-ceramics sheets, this technology offers the possibility to integrate into the LTCC body passive electrical components and conductor lines typically manufactured in thick-film technology. This differs from semiconductor device fabrication, where layers are processed serially, and each new layer is fabricated on top of previous layers.

== History ==
Co-fired ceramics were first developed in the late 1950s and early 1960s to make more robust capacitors. The technology was later expanded in the 1960s to include multilayer structures similar to printed circuit boards.

== Components ==
=== Hybrid circuits ===
LTCC technology is especially beneficial for RF and high-frequency applications. In RF and Wireless applications, LTCC technology is also used to produce multilayer hybrid integrated circuits, which can include resistors, inductors, capacitors, and active components in the same package. In detail, these applications comprise mobile telecommunication devices (0.8–2 GHz), Wireless local networks such as Bluetooth (2.4 GHz) to in-car radars (50–140 GHz, and 76 GHz). LTCC hybrids have a smaller initial ("non recurring") cost as compared with ICs, making them an attractive alternative to ASICs for small scale integration devices.

=== Inductors ===
Inductors are formed by printing conductor windings on ferrite ceramic tape. Depending on the desired inductance and current carrying capabilities a partial winding to several windings may be printed on each layer. Under certain circumstances, a non-ferrite ceramic may be used. This is most common for hybrid circuits where capacitors, inductors, and resistors will all be present and for high operating frequency applications where the hysteresis loop of the ferrite becomes an issue.

=== Resistors ===
Resistors may be embedded components or added to the top layer post-firing. Using screen printing, a resistor paste is printed onto the LTCC surface, from which resistances needed in the circuit are generated. When fired, these resistors deviate from their design value (±25%) and therefore require adjustment to meet the final tolerance. With Laser trimming one can achieve these resistances with different cut forms to the exact resistance value (±1%) desired. With this procedure, the need for additional discrete resistors can be reduced, thereby allowing a further miniaturization of the printed circuit boards.

=== Transformers ===
LTCC transformers are similar to LTCC inductors except transformers contain two or more windings. To improve coupling between windings transformers includes a low-permeability dielectric material printed over the windings on each layer. The monolithic nature of LTCC transformers leads to a lower height than traditional wire wound transformers. Also, the integrated core and windings mean these transformers are not prone to wire break failures in high mechanical stress environments.

=== Sensors ===
Integration of thick-film passive components and 3D mechanical structures inside one module permitted the fabrication of sophisticated 3D LTCC sensors e.g. accelerometers.

=== Microsystems ===
The possibility of the fabrication of many various passive thick-film components, sensors and 3D mechanical structures enabled the fabrication of multilayer LTCC microsystems.

Using HTCC technology, microsystems for harsh environments, such as working temperatures of 1000 °C, have been realized.

=== Applications ===
LTCC substrates can be most beneficially used for the realization of miniaturized devices and robust substrates. LTCC technology allows the combination of individual layers with different functionalities such as high permittivity and low dielectric loss into a single multilayer laminated package and thereby to achieve multi-functionality in combination with a high integration and interconnection level. It also provides the possibility to fabricate three-dimensional, robust structures enabling in combination with thick film technology the integration of passive, electronic components, such as capacitors, resistors, and inductors into a single device.

== Comparison ==
Low-temperature co-firing technology presents advantages compared to other packaging technologies including high-temperature co-firing: the ceramic is generally fired below 1,000 °C due to a special composition of the material. This permits the co-firing with highly conductive materials (silver, copper, and gold). LTCC also features the ability to embed passive elements, such as resistors, capacitors and inductors into the ceramic package, minimising the size of the completed module.

HTCC components generally consist of multilayers of alumina or zirconia with platinum, tungsten and moly-manganese metalization. The advantages of HTCC in packaging technology includes mechanical rigidity and hermeticity, both of which are important in high-reliability and environmentally stressful applications. Another advantage is HTCC's thermal dissipation capability, which makes this a microprocessor packaging choice, especially for higher-performance processors.

Compared to LTCC, HTCC has higher-resistance conductive layers.

== See also ==
- Tape casting
- Laser trimming
