= Jewel bearing =

Jewel-lined bearing used in precision instruments, particularly mechanical watches

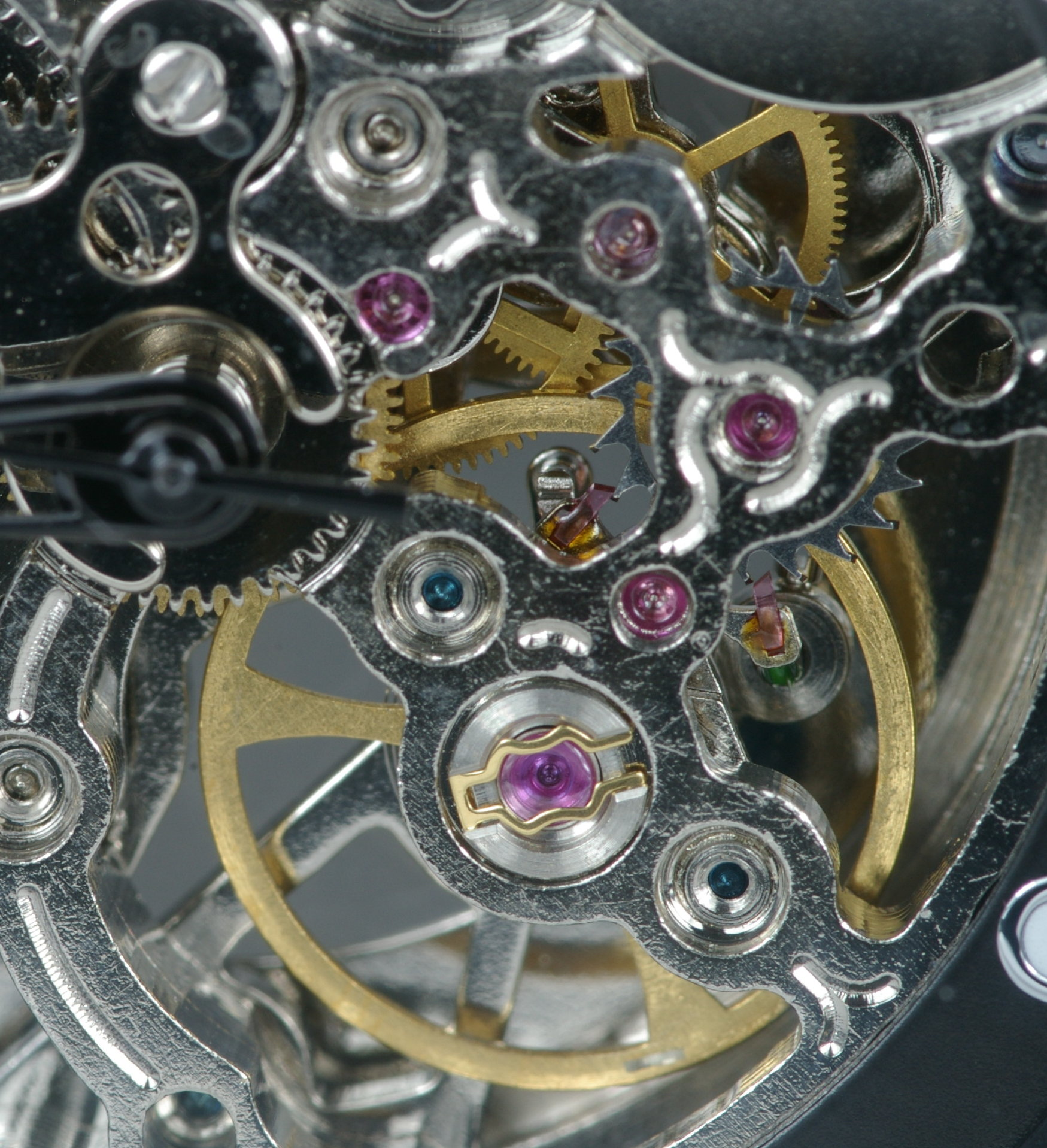
Ruby jewel bearings used for a balance wheel in a mechanical watch movement

Cross-section of a jewel bearing in a mechanical watch. This type of donut-shaped bearing (red) is called a hole jewel, used for most of the ordinary wheels in the gear train. It is usually made of synthetic sapphire or ruby, press-fit into a hole in the movement's supporting plate (grey). The cup-shaped depression in the top of the jewel is the oil cup; its purpose is to hold the lubricating oil (yellow) in contact with the bearing shaft by capillary action.

In wheels where friction is critical, a capstone is added on the end to prevent the shoulder of the shaft from bearing against the face of the jewel.

A jewel bearing is a plain bearing in which a metal spindle turns in a jewel-lined pivot hole. The hole is typically shaped like a torus and is slightly larger than the shaft diameter. The jewels are typically made from the mineral corundum, usually either synthetic sapphire or synthetic ruby. Jewel bearings are used in precision instruments where low friction, long life, and dimensional accuracy are important. Their main use is in mechanical watches.

== History ==
Jewel bearings were invented in 1704 for use in watches by Nicolas Fatio de Duillier, Peter Debaufre, and Jacob Debaufre, who received an English patent (no. 371) for the idea. Originally natural jewels were used, such as diamond, sapphire, ruby, and garnet. In 1902, a process to make synthetic sapphire and ruby (crystalline aluminium oxide, also known as corundum) was invented by Auguste Verneuil, making jewelled bearings much cheaper. Today most jewelled bearings are synthetic ruby or sapphire.

Historically, jewel pivots were made by grinding using diamond abrasive. Modern jewel pivots are often made using high-powered lasers, chemical etching, and ultrasonic milling.

During World War II jewel bearings were one of the products restricted by the United States government War Production Board as critical to the war effort.

== Characteristics ==
The advantages of jewel bearings include high accuracy, very small size and weight, low and predictable friction, good temperature stability, and the ability to operate without lubrication and in corrosive environments. They are known for their low kinetic friction and highly consistent static friction. The static coefficient of friction of brass-on-steel is 0.35, while that of sapphire-on-steel is 0.10–0.15. Sapphire surfaces are very hard and durable, with Mohs hardness of 9 and Knoop hardness of 1800, and can maintain smoothness over decades of use, thus reducing friction variability. Disadvantages include brittleness and fragility, limited availability and applicability in medium and large bearing sizes and capacities, and friction variations if the load is not axial. Like other bearings, most jeweled pivots use oil lubrication to reduce friction.

== Uses ==
The predominant use of jewel bearings is in mechanical watches, where their low and predictable friction improves watch accuracy as well as improving bearing life. Manufacturers traditionally listed the number of jewels prominently on the watch face or back, as an advertising point. A typical fully jeweled time-only watch has 17 jewels: two cap jewels, two pivot jewels and an impulse jewel for the balance wheel, two pivot jewels and two pallet jewels for the pallet fork, and two pivot jewels each for the escape, fourth, third, and center wheels. In modern quartz watches, the timekeeper is a quartz crystal in an electronic circuit, powering a small stepper motor. Because of the small amount of torque needed to move the hands, there is almost no pressure on the bearings and no real gain by using a jewel bearing, hence they are not used in a large proportion of quartz movements.

The other major use of jeweled bearings is in sensitive mechanical measuring instruments. They are typically used for delicate linkages that must carry very small forces, in instruments such as galvanometers, compasses, gyroscopes, gimbals, dial indicators, dial calipers, and turbine flow meters. In such instruments, jewel bearings are often used as pivots for their needles which need to move reliably and with low variability even when measuring small changes. Bearing bores are typically smaller than 1 mm and support loads weighing less than 1 gram, although they are made as large as 10 mm and may support loads up to about 500 g. Their use has diminished with the popularization of digital measuring instruments.

== See also ==
- Incabloc shock protection system
- The Clock of the Long Now which will use ceramic bearings with no lubrication at low speed
