= Antimagnetic watch =

Watch resistant to magnetic fluctuations

Anti-magnetic (non-magnetic) watches are those that are able to run with minimal deviation when exposed to a certain level of magnetic field. The International Organization for Standardization issued a standard for magnetic-resistant watches, which many countries have adopted.

== ISO 764 magnetic-resistant watches standard ==
The international standard ISO 764 Horology—Magnetic resistant watches defines the resistance of watches to magnetic fields. According to ISO 764 or its equivalent DIN 8309 (Deutsches Institut für Normung - German Institute for Standardization) a watch must resist exposure to a direct current magnetic field of 4800 A/m. The watch must keep its accuracy to ±30 seconds/day as measured before the test in order to be acknowledged as a magnetic-resistant watch. Annex A of ISO 764 deals with watches designated as magnetic resistant with an additional indication of intensity of a magnetic field exceeding 4800 A/m.

There are two ways of building an anti-magnetic watch:

- The first way consists of making the moving parts of alloys chosen to be insensitive to magnetic fields. These alloys include Invar (iron–nickel–carbon–chromium alloy), Glucydur (beryllium–bronze alloy), Nivarox (iron–nickel–chromium–titanium–beryllium alloy) and Elinvar (an alloy similar to Invar, though less resistant to magnetism and more resistant to thermal influence). These alloys are preferred by different watchmakers due to their differing properties. In the 1960s, almost all Swiss watches had Glucydur balance and Nivarox hairsprings. The anchors, escape wheels and other watch mechanisms were also made of non-magnetic metals or alloys.
- The other way of making a watch non-magnetic is to house the entire movement into a case made of a highly permeable (magnetically conductive) material. The movement is covered by an additional soft-iron clasp to prevent the formation of magnetic fields inside the watch itself.

== History ==
The first recorded experiments in anti-magnetic watch-making were in 1846. Watchmakers from Vacheron Constantin were among the first to experiment with anti-magnetic features of a watch. However, they succeeded in assembling the first anti-magnetic watch only several decades later. That watch was able to withstand magnetic fields because some of its parts were made of non-magnetic metals: the palladium-made balance wheel, balance spring and the lever shaft.

In 1896 Charles Édouard Guillaume discovered the nickel-based alloy Invar. Afterwards, in 1920, when he received the Nobel Prize in Physics, he developed another alloy - Elinvar. These alloys assisted in the assembly of anti-magnetic watches. Invar and Elinvar are able to resist magnetic fields, allowing the watch to continue keeping accurate time.

The first anti-magnetic pocket watch was assembled by Vacheron Constantin in 1915.

In 1930, Tissot produced the first ever non-magnetic wristwatch.

== Usage ==
Since their appearance, anti-magnetic watches have been favored by people who deal with high magnetic fields. They are widespread among electronic engineers and in other professions where strong magnetic fields are present.

Today, even divers' watches (according to ISO 6425) must be anti-magnetic as well as being water resistant, sufficiently luminous, shock resistant and have solid straps.

== Contributions ==
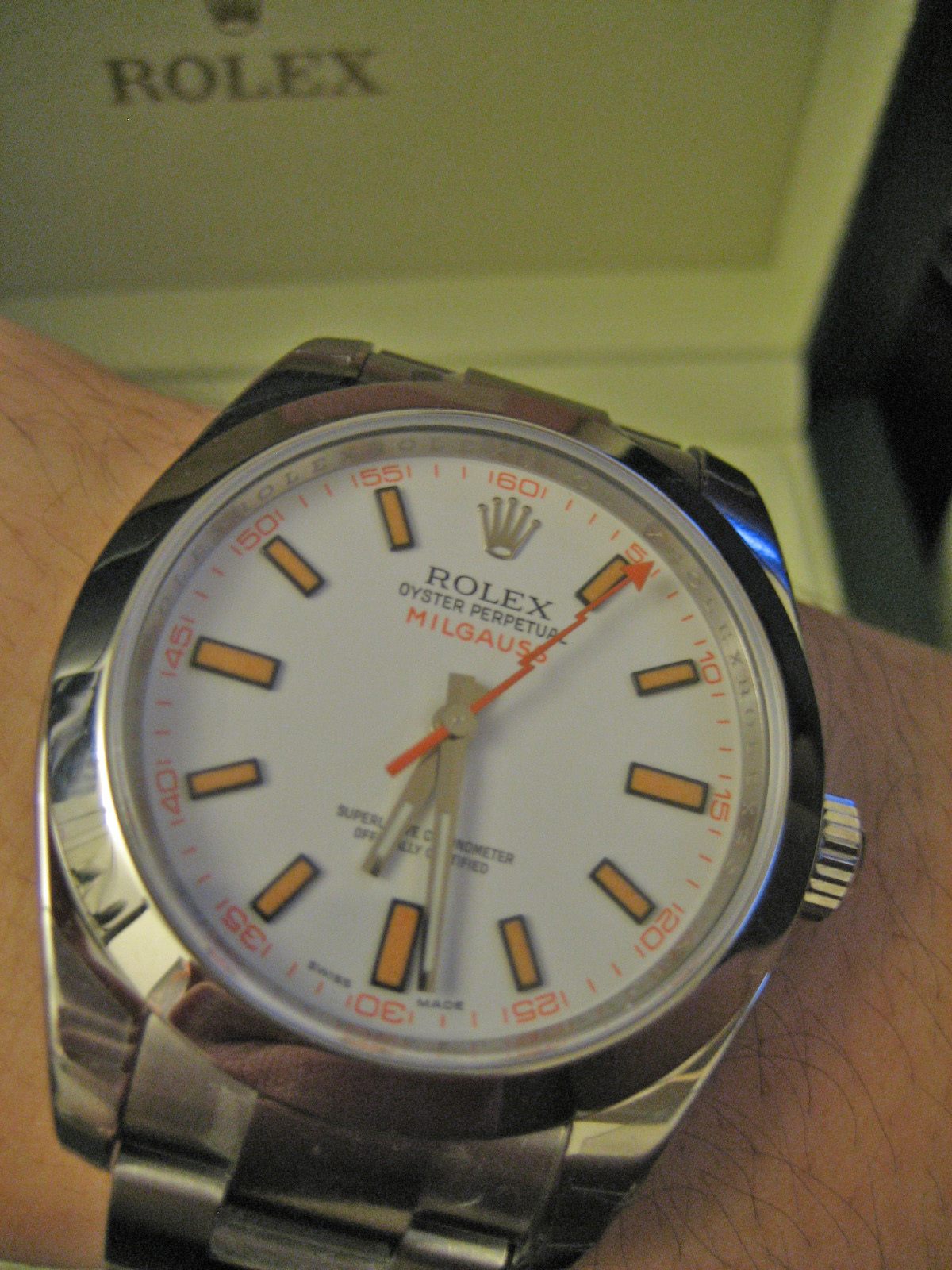
New version of the Rolex Milgauss

After discovering the alloys for assembling anti-magnetic watches, many watch-making brands utilize such materials in production in order to improve the performance of such timepieces.

=== IWC ===
In 1989, IWC first manufactured the Ingenieur Reference 3508, which was able to withstand huge magnetic fields of up to 500000 A/m.

=== Omega ===
The Omega Anti-Magnetic Seamaster was announced 17 January 2013 (e.g. Seamaster Aqua Terra > 15,000 gauss). According to the press release, the OMEGA movement does not rely on a protective container inside the watchcase but on the use of selected non-ferrous materials in the movement itself. The OMEGA prototype was subjected to 1.5 tesla (15,000 gauss) and continued to perform. Testing showed that the watch was as accurate after its magnetic exposure as it had been before.

=== Rolex ===
The Rolex Milgauss series of antimagnetic certified chronometers was first manufactured in 1954 with the model 6541 for those working in nuclear, aircraft, and medical settings associated with strong magnetic fields. The watch has an advertised magnetic flux density resistance of 1,000 Gauss within magnetic fields of 80,000 A/m. In 2007, after being out of production for nearly two decades a new Milgauss was introduced as the model number 116400.

=== Sinn ===
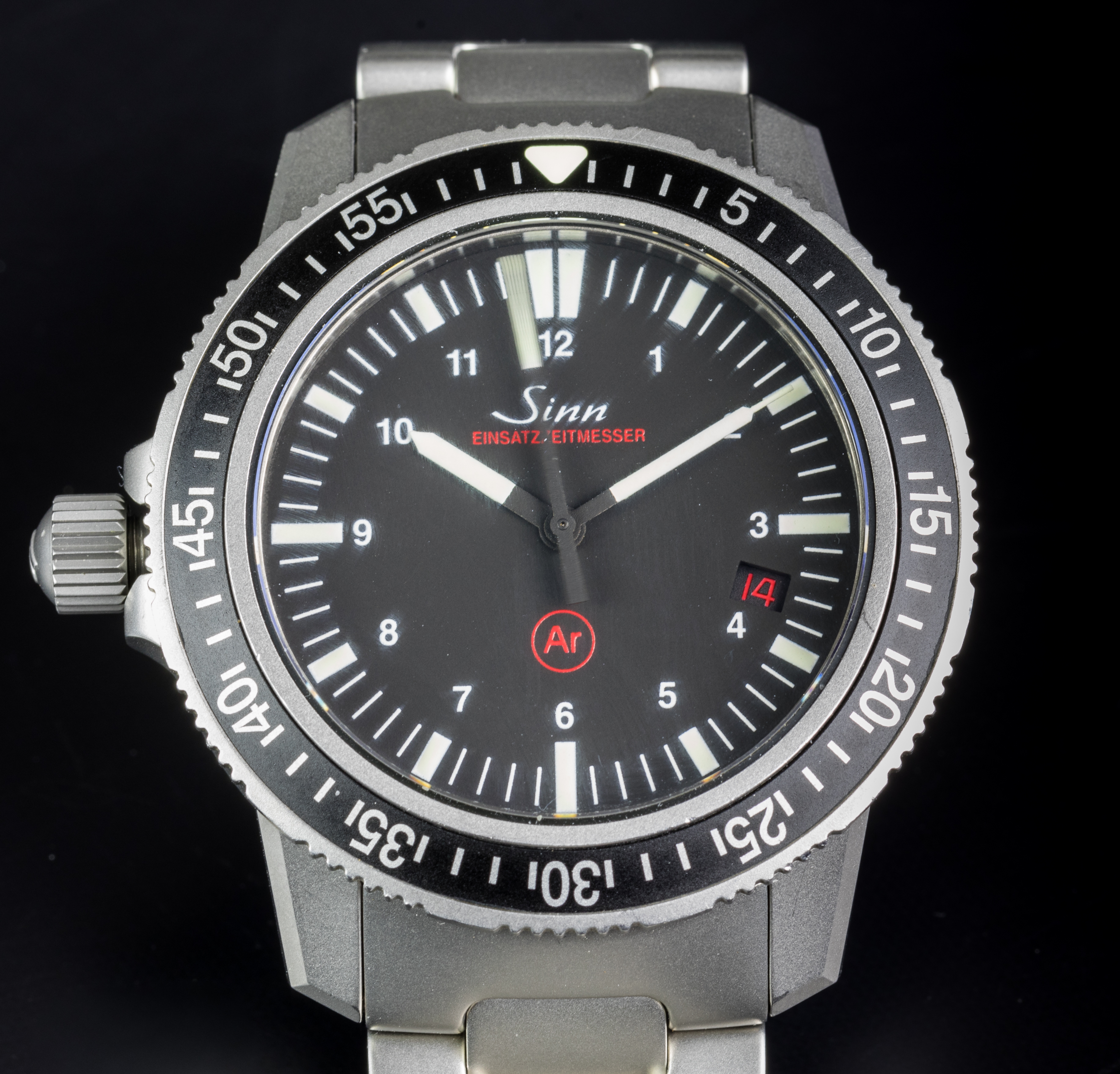
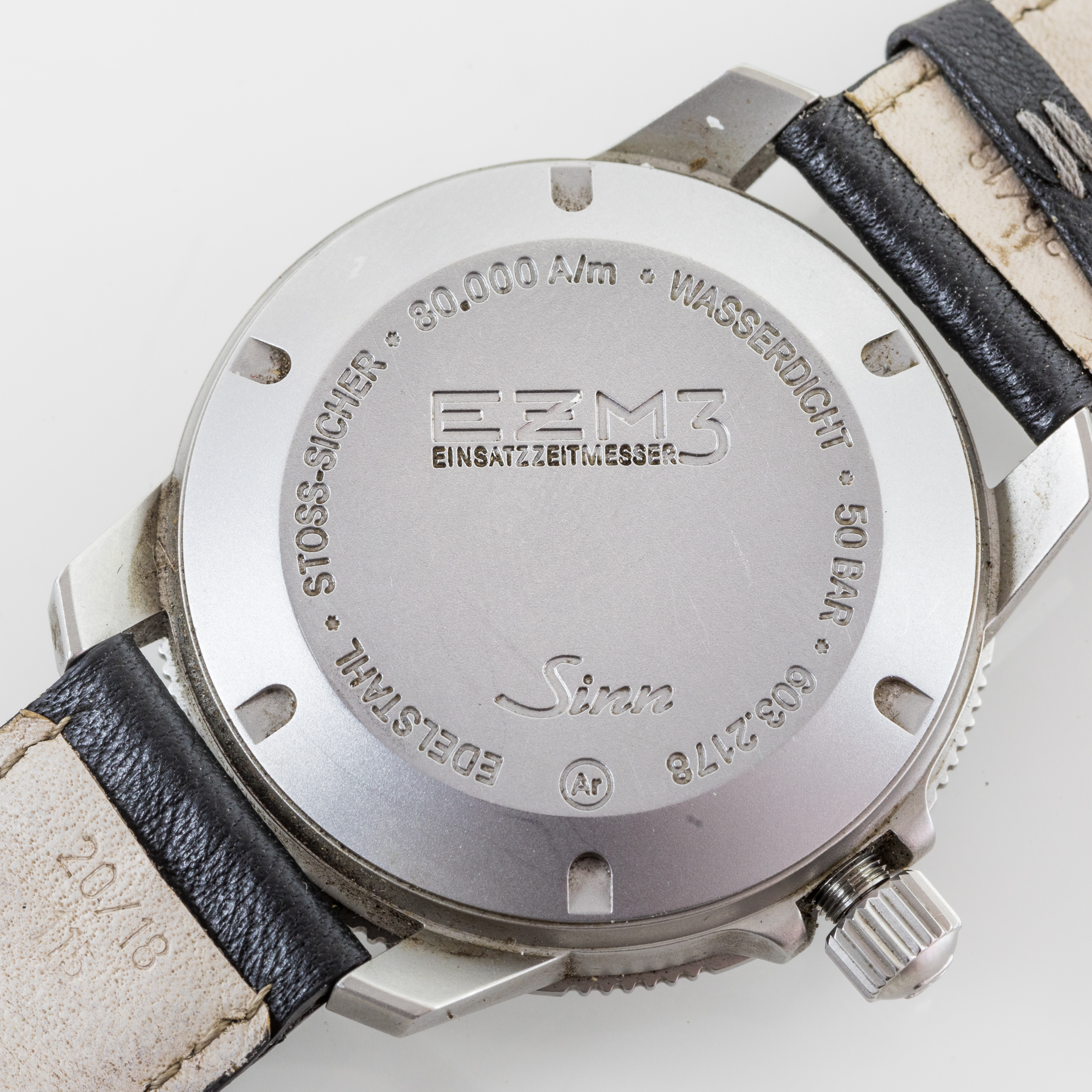
Diving watch Sinn "Einsatzzeitmesser 3" (EZM 3), highly resistant against shock, pressure and magnetic fields

Certain diving watches produced by Sinn as mission timers (in German: "Einsatzzeitmesser") for professional users are also protected against magnetic fields up to 1,000 gauss / 80,000 A/m, using a protective sheath consisting of a closed, magnetically soft inner case that includes the dial, the movement holding ring and the case back.

=== METAS N001 requirements ===
The Swiss Federal Institute of Metrology (METAS) has METAS N001 requirements for movements and mechanical watches resistant to magnetic fields of 1.5 tesla (15,000 gauss). The METAS N001 certification demands a series of tests amongst other relevant requirements and the watches are subjected to strong magnetic field exposures without resulting in the movement stopping or a 0 to ≤5 seconds daily rate deviation.
