= Bimetallic strip =

Two-sided strip that coils when heated or cooled

Diagram of a bimetallic strip showing how the difference in thermal expansion in the two metals leads to a larger sideways displacement of the strip, because the two bars are attached to each other. The grey metal has a lower thermal expansion rate than the orange metal.

A bimetallic coil from a thermostat reacts to the heat from a lighter, by uncoiling and then coiling back up when the lighter is removed.

A bimetallic strip or bimetal strip is a strip that consists of two strips of different metals which expand at different rates as they are heated. The different expansion rates cause the strip to bend one way if heated, and in the opposite direction if cooled below its initial temperature. Thus, a bimetal strip converts a temperature change into mechanical displacement. The metal with the higher coefficient of thermal expansion is on the outer side of the curve when the strip is heated and on the inner side when cooled. Common applications include temperature sensing (thermometer) and regulation (thermostat).

The invention of the bimetallic strip is generally credited to John Harrison, an eighteenth-century clockmaker who made it for his third marine chronometer (H3) of 1759 to compensate for temperature-induced changes in the balance spring. Harrison's invention is recognized in the memorial to him in Westminster Abbey, England.

== Characteristics ==
The strip consists of two strips of different metals which expand at different rates as they are heated, usually steel and copper, or in some cases steel and brass. The strips are joined throughout their length by riveting, brazing or welding. The different expansions force the flat strip to bend one way if heated, and in the opposite direction if cooled below its initial temperature. The metal with the higher coefficient of thermal expansion is on the outer side of the curve when the strip is heated and on the inner side when cooled. The sideways displacement of the strip is much larger than the small lengthways expansion in either of the two metals.

In some applications, the bimetal strip is used in the flat form. In others, it is wrapped into a coil for compactness. The greater length of the coiled version gives improved sensitivity.

The radius of curvature $R$ of a bimetallic strip depends on temperature $T$ according the formula derived by French physicist Yvon Villarceau in 1863 in his research for improving the precision of clocks:

$$\frac{1}{R} - \frac{1}{R_0} = \frac{3}{2a} \frac{(\alpha_2-\alpha_1) (T-T_0)}{h} = \frac{3}{2a} \frac{\Delta\epsilon}{h}$$,

where $h = h_1 + h_2$ is the total thickness of the bimetal and $a = 1 + (E_1 h_1^2 - E_2 h_2^2)^2 / (4\ E_1 h_1\ E_2 h_2\ h^2)$ is a dimensionless coefficient. For each metallic strip: $E_i$ is the Young modulus, $\alpha_i$ is the coefficient of thermal expansion and $h_i$ is the thickness. The formula can also be rewritten as a function of the thermal misfit strain $\Delta\epsilon = (\alpha_2-\alpha_1)(T-T_0)$. And if the modulus and height are similar, we simply have $a \simeq 1$.

An equivalent formula can be derived from the beam theory.

== History ==
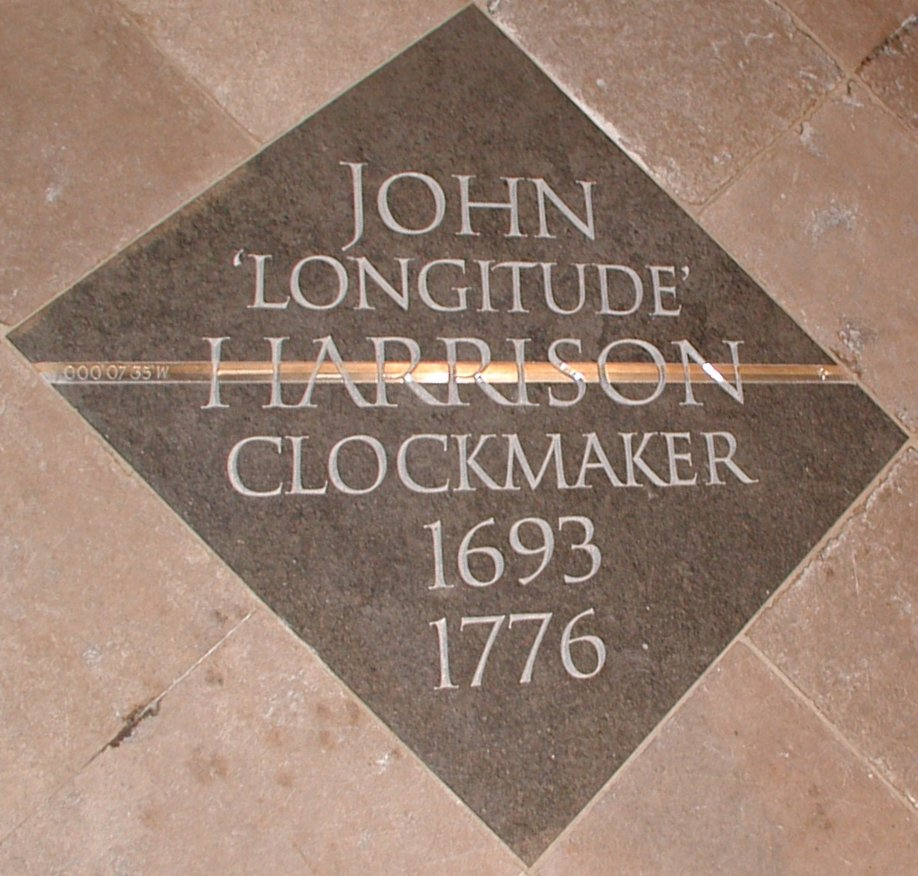
John Harrison's Memorial in Westminster Abbey, London

The earliest surviving bimetallic strip was made by the eighteenth-century clockmaker John Harrison who is generally credited with its invention. He made it for his third marine chronometer (H3) of 1759 to compensate for temperature-induced changes in the balance spring. It should not be confused with the bimetallic mechanism for correcting for thermal expansion in his gridiron pendulum. His earliest examples had two individual metal strips joined by rivets but he also invented the later technique of directly fusing molten brass onto a steel substrate. A strip of this type was fitted to his last timekeeper, H5. Harrison's invention is recognized in the memorial to him in Westminster Abbey, England.

== Composition ==
The metals involved in a bimetallic strip can vary in composition so long as their coefficients of thermal expansion differ significantly. The metal with the lower thermal expansion coefficient is called the passive (or low-expansion) metal, while the other is called the active (or high-expansion) metal.

Common material combinations include:

- Steel and copper
- Steel and brass
- Invar (a nickel–iron alloy) and brass

Typical coefficients of linear thermal expansion (×10⁻⁶ /K):

- Invar: 1–2
- Steel (mild steel): 11–13
- Nickel: 13
- Copper: 16–17
- Brass: 18–19

Material selection has a significant impact on the operating temperature range and sensitivity of the bimetallic strip. Some combinations can operate up to 500 °C, while others are limited to approximately 150 °C.

== Manufacturing ==
Bimetallic strips are typically manufactured by bonding two different metals together. Common methods include:

- Roll bonding (most common): The two metal strips are passed through high-pressure rollers at elevated temperature to achieve a strong metallurgical bond.
- Explosive welding
- Brazing or soldering
- Electroplating or casting one metal onto the other (as John Harrison did with brass on steel).

After bonding, the strip is often annealed (heat-treated) to relieve internal stresses and then rolled or drawn to the desired thickness. Precise control of the thickness ratio between the two layers is critical, as it directly affects the sensitivity and curvature of the final strip.

Modern manufacturing processes allow for very thin bimetallic strips (down to 0.1 mm or less) and long coils, enabling their use in compact devices such as miniature circuit breakers and precision thermostats.

== Applications ==
Bimetallic strips are used in many temperature-sensing and control devices due to their ability to convert temperature changes into mechanical movement.

- Thermostats: The strip bends with temperature changes to open or close electrical contacts, turning heating or cooling systems on and off.
- Thermometers: Coiled bimetallic strips are commonly used in mechanical dial thermometers to move a pointer indicating temperature.
- Circuit breakers: In miniature circuit breakers and thermal overload protectors, the strip bends when overheated by excess current, tripping the breaker to protect the circuit.
- Other uses: They are also found in fire alarms, thermal time-delay relays, gas oven safety valves, fluorescent lamp starters, and older turn signal flashers.

=== Clocks ===
Mechanical clock mechanisms are sensitive to temperature changes as each part has tiny tolerance and it leads to errors in time keeping. A bimetallic strip is used to compensate this phenomenon in the mechanism of some timepieces. The most common method is to use a bimetallic construction for the circular rim of the balance wheel. What it does is move a weight in a radial way looking at the circular plane down by the balance wheel, varying then, the momentum of inertia of the balance wheel. As the spring controlling the balance becomes weaker with the increasing temperature, the balance becomes smaller in diameter to decrease the momentum of inertia and keep the period of oscillation (and hence timekeeping) constant.

Nowadays this system is not used anymore since the appearance of low temperature coefficient alloys like nivarox, parachrom and many others depending on each brand.

=== Thermostats ===
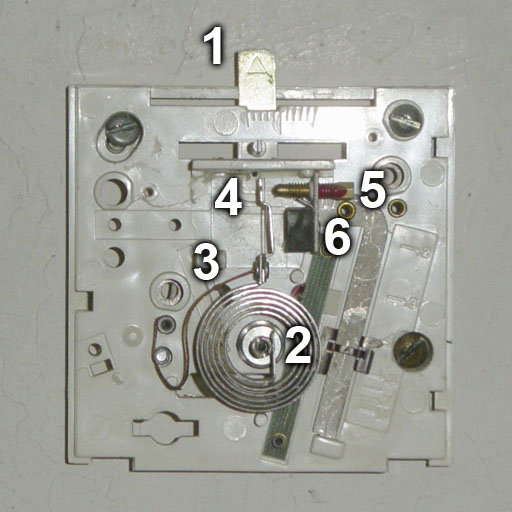
Thermostat with bimetal coil at (2)

In the regulation of heating and cooling, thermostats that operate over a wide range of temperatures are used. In these, one end of the bimetallic strip is mechanically fixed and attached to an electrical power source, while the other (moving) end carries an electrical contact. In adjustable thermostats another contact is positioned with a regulating knob or lever. The position so set controls the regulated temperature, called the set point.

Some thermostats use a mercury switch connected to both electrical leads. The angle of the entire mechanism is adjustable to control the set point of the thermostat.

Depending upon the application, a higher temperature may open a contact (as in a heater control) or it may close a contact (as in a refrigerator or air conditioner).

The electrical contacts may control the power directly (as in a household iron) or indirectly, switching electrical power through a relay or the supply of natural gas or fuel oil through an electrically operated valve. In some natural gas heaters the power may be provided with a thermocouple that is heated by a pilot light (a small, continuously burning, flame). In devices without pilot lights for ignition (as in most modern gas clothes dryers and some natural gas heaters and decorative fireplaces) the power for the contacts is provided by reduced household electrical power that operates a relay controlling an electronic ignitor, either a resistance heater or an electrically powered spark generating device.

=== Thermometers ===
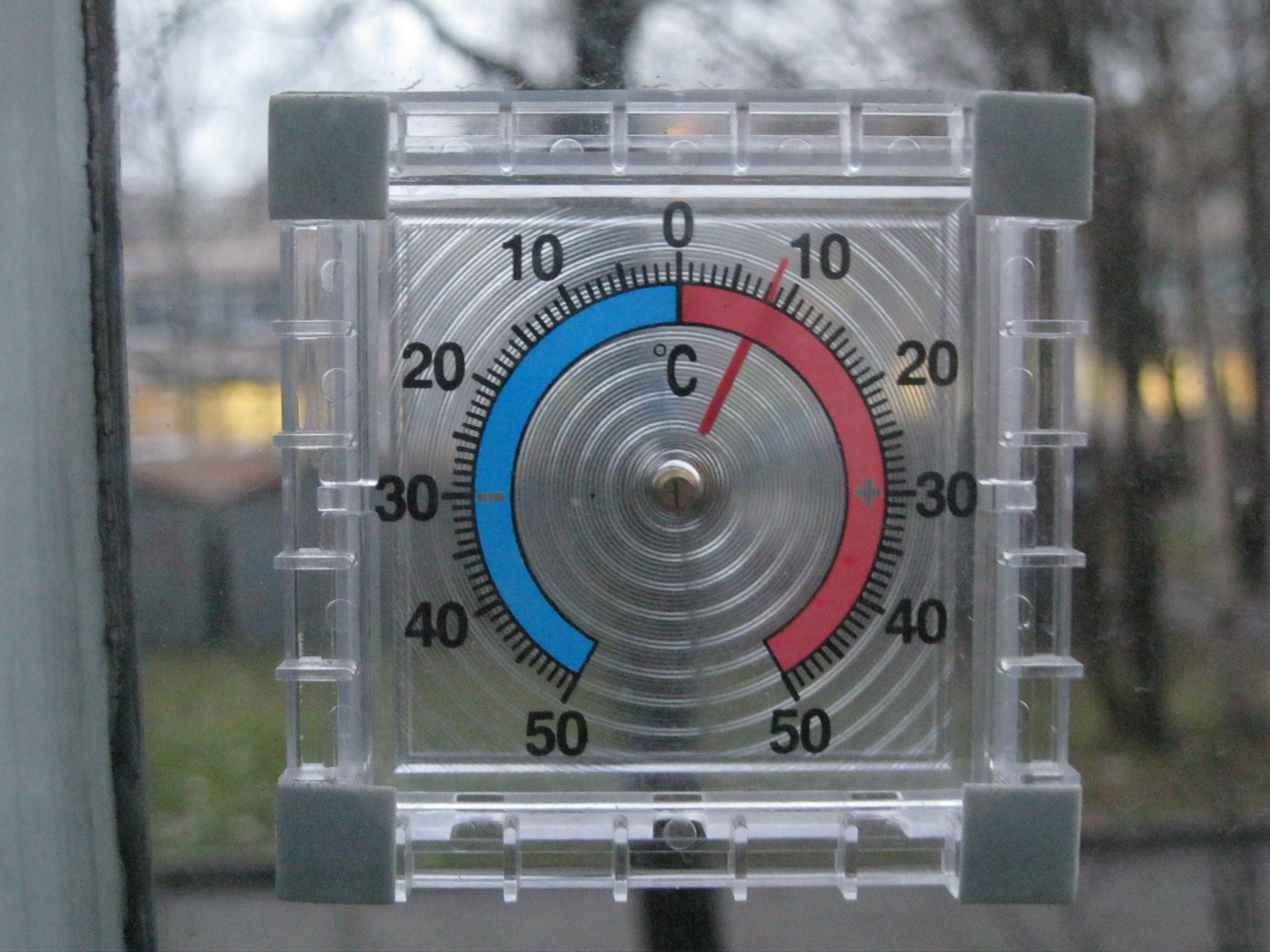
A mechanical outdoor thermometer.

A direct indicating dial thermometer, common in household devices (such as a patio thermometer or a meat thermometer), uses a bimetallic strip wrapped into a coil in its most common design. The coil changes the linear movement of the metal expansion into a circular movement thanks to the helicoidal shape it draws. One end of the coil is fixed to the housing of the device as a fix point and the other drives an indicating needle inside a circular indicator. A bimetallic strip is also used in a recording thermometer. Breguet's thermometer consists of a tri-metallic helix in order to have a more accurate result.

=== Heat engine ===
Heat engines are not the most efficient ones, and with the use of bimetallic strips the efficiency of the heat engine is even lower as there is no chamber to contain the heat. Moreover, the bimetallic strips cannot produce strength in its moves, the reason why is that in order to achieve reasonables bendings (movements) both metallic strips have to be thin to make the difference between the expansion noticeable. So the uses for metallic strips in heat engines are mostly in simple toys that have been built to demonstrate how the principle can be used to drive a heat engine.

=== Fire Alarms ===
When the temperature of an area has risen, the metals of the bimetallic strip which are bonded together in the fire alarm each expand at a different rate upon heating. When the strip is heated, the metal with the higher coefficient of Thermal expansion bends towards the metal with the lower coefficient. This bending action is used to close a circuit, which triggers the alarm or any other function used in the alarm.

=== Electrical devices ===
Bimetal strips are used in miniature circuit breakers to protect circuits from excess current. A coil of wire is used to heat a bimetal strip, which bends and operates a linkage that unlatches a spring-operated contact. This interrupts the circuit and can be reset when the bimetal strip has cooled down.

Bimetal strips are also used in time-delay relays, gas oven safety valves, thermal flashers for older turn signal lamps, and fluorescent lamp starters. In some devices, the current running directly through the bimetal strip is sufficient to heat it and operate contacts directly. It has also been used in mechanical PWM voltage regulators for automotive uses.

== See also ==
- Thermotime switch
