= Havar (alloy) =

High-performance cobalt alloy

Havar, or UNS R30004, is an alloy of cobalt, possessing a very high mechanical strength. It can be heat-treated. It is highly resistant to corrosion and is non-magnetic. It is biocompatible. It has high fatigue resistance. It is a precipitation hardening superalloy.

== Chemical composition ==
The composition of Havar alloy is the following:

Composition of Havar alloy (wt. %)
Metal	Symbol	Average	Min	Max
(—)	(—)	(wt. %)	(wt. %)	(wt. %)
Cobalt	Co	42.0	41.0	44.0
Chromium	Cr	19.5	19.0	21.0
Nickel	Ni	12.7	12.0	14.0
Tungsten	W	2.7	2.3	3.3
Molybdenum	Mo	2.2	2.0	2.8
Manganese	Mn	1.6	1.35	1.8
Carbon	C	0.2	0.17	0.23
Beryllium	Be	0.05	0.02	0.08
Iron	Fe	19.05	22.16	12.79

== Physical properties ==
Havar melting point is about 1480 °C. It will retain three quarters of its room temperature strengths up to 510 °C. Its density is 8.3 g/cm^{3}. Its thermal conductivity is 13.0 W/m·K. Its tensile strength is 960-970 MPa and its modulus of elasticity is 200 – 210 GPa. It can be joined by welding: Gas metal arc welding (GMAW), resistance welding, soldering, and brazing.

== Applications ==
Havar foils of various thickness are used as diaphragms for pressure sensing in process control equipment, biocompatible medical implants, as particle beam windows for beamlines of particle accelerators in nuclear physics, and various other high-temperature applications.

Havar foils are frequently used as window material for high-energy proton beams used in the production of fluorine-18 from oxygen-18 enriched water. ^{18}F is a beta plus emitter commonly used in positron emission tomography (PET) scan. The high mechanical strength and the good corrosion resistance of Havar foils are both essential for the tightness and the reliability of the cyclotron targets in hospitals while also minimizing the contamination of H_{2}^{18}O in the targets by the activation products of the transition metals (Cr, Mn, Fe, Co, Ni, W, Mo) present in the alloy.

== History ==
Havar was originally developed in the late 1940s by Hamilton Watch Company as an alloy for the mainsprings used in watches, and named Dynavar. Later it was used as sensing diaphragms and other uses, under its current name Havar.

== Corrosion resistance ==
Its corrosion resistance allows use in stress corrosion resistant springs and diaphragms in oilfield equipment handling sour crude oil. Havar outperforms 316L stainless steel in resistance to pitting corrosion and crevice corrosion in medical implant environment. In cold-rolled and aged form, its yield and tensile strength are higher than of other cobalt-based implant alloys.

In Green death, a solution used to test the resistance to corrosion of metals, the Havar alloy does not corrode at all at room temperature, starts corroding rapidly (15 mm/year) at 70 °C, and reaches rate of 56 mm/year at boiling point (~103 °C).

== Machining ==
Havar is difficult to machine, as it undergoes rapid work hardening under the cutting tool. The tool should be as sharp as possible and the machine should be rigid, with minimal backlash. Higher power is required than to machine ordinary steels of similar hardness.

== See also ==
Other special alloys are the following:

- Hastelloy – Corrosion-resistant and high-temperature alloys
- Inconel – Austenitic nickel-chromium superalloys
- Invar – Alloy of nickel and iron with low coefficient of thermal expansion
- Monel – Solid-solution binary alloy of nickel and copper
- Nivaflex – Cobalt alloy used in watchmaking
- Stellite – Wear resistant cobalt-chromium alloys
- Superalloy – Alloy with higher durability than normal metals
