= Villarceau =

Villarceau or Villarceaux may refer to:

- Yvon Villarceau, a 19th-century French astronomer, mathematician, and engineer
- Villarceau circles, a pair of circles found in an obliquely cut torus, which are named after him
- Domaine of Villarceaux, a château, water garden, and park in the commune of Chaussy in the Val d'Oise Department of France
