= Ratio meter systems =

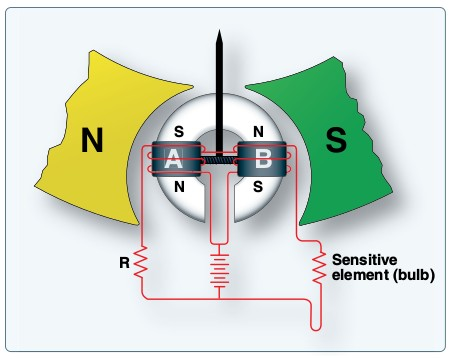
A ratiometer temperature measuring indicator has two coils. As the sensor bulb resistance varies with temperature, different amounts of current flow through the coils. This produces varying magnetic fields. These fields interact with the magnetic field of a large permanent magnet, resulting in an indication of temperature.

A Ratiometer type temperature indicating system consists of a sensing element and a moving-coil indicator, which unlike the conventional type has two coils moving together in a permanent-magnet field of non-uniform strength. The coil arrangements and the methods of obtaining the non-uniform field depends on the manufacturer's design. The main application behind in this ratiometer system is to find the unknown resistance, namely Rx. This plays a major role in the aircraft industry, in finding cylinder head temperatures exposed to turbine exhaust gases. It can also be used to measure temperatures of systems such as engine oil and carburetor air.

== Methods of obtaining non-uniform magnetic coil ==
=== Parallel coil ===
Parallel coil is a method of obtaining non-uniform coil in ratiometer systems in which the hairsprings are wounded parallelly in order to allow the signal to pass through it.

=== Cross coil ===
The coil is wound from 99.99% pure copper on a wood which was treated with many oxidizers and chemicals.

The benefits from using foil inductors comes in the form of less distortion and higher dynamic headroom, when used on crossovers for modern high performance speakers.

In these methods two parallel resistance arms are formed; one containing the coil and a fixed calibrating resistance R1, and the other containing a coil in series with a calibrating resistance R2 and the temperature-sensing element Rx. Both arms are supplied with direct current from the aircraft's main power source, but the coils are so wound that current flows through them in opposite directions.

As in any moving-coil indicator, rotation of the measuring element is produced by forces which are proportional to product of the current and field strength, and the direction of rotation depends on the direction of current relative to the magnetic field. In a ratio meter, therefore, it follows that the force produced by one coil will always tend to rotate the measuring element in the opposite direction to the force produced by the second coil, and further more, as the magnetic field is of non-uniform strength, the coil carrying the greater current will always move towards the area of weaker field, and vice versa.

When the temperature at the sensing element Rx increases, then in accordance with the temperature/resistance relationship of the material used for the element, its resistance will increase and so cause a decrease in the force created by it.

When the measuring elements at the mid-position of its rotation, the currents in both windings can be in the same field strength simultaneously.

A ratiometer systems, however, do not require hair springs for exerting a controlling torque, this being provided solely by the appropriate coil winding and non-uniform field arrangements. Should variations occur in the power supply they will affect both coils equally so that the ratio of current flowing in the coils remains the same and tendencies for them to move to positions of differing field strength are counterbalanced.
