= Gyromax =

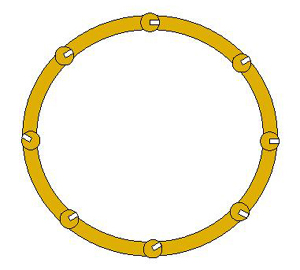
Gyromax balance wheel, not showing the spokes and center arbor.

Closeup of collet (weight).

The Gyromax is the trade name for an adjustable mass (or adjustable inertia) balance wheel used in Patek Philippe wristwatches. Instead of weight adjustment screws on the outside of the rim, as in traditional balances, the Gyromax has turnable weights recessed into the top of the rim. The advantages claimed for this design are that, without projecting weight screws, the diameter of the balance can be increased, giving it a larger moment of inertia, and that it has less air resistance.

The Gyromax balance has six to eight small turnable weights that fit on pins located in recesses around the top of the balance wheel rim. Each of the weights, called collets, has a cutout making it heavier on one side. When the collet's cutout points to the outside of the balance wheel, the heavier side is toward the center which decreases the wheel's moment of inertia, increasing its speed. When the collet's cutout points toward the center, the weight moves outward and the balance wheel turns more slowly. A watchmaker can turn an individual collet to adjust the wheel's balance, referred to as 'poise', or pairs of opposing collets to adjust the wheel's rotation speed. The Gyromax is a 'free sprung' balance, meaning there is no regulator on the wheel's balance spring for adjusting the watch's rate, so the collets are used for adjusting both poise and rate.

Swiss patents were granted to Patek Phillipe for the Gyromax balance on May 15, 1949 and December 31, 1951, and the balance was first used in watches in 1952. Another balance wheel with a similar design is the Rolex Microstella.
