= Glucydur =

Glucydur is the trade name of a metal alloy with a low coefficient of thermal expansion, used for making balance wheels and other parts of mechanical watches.

Glucydur is a beryllium bronze; an alloy of beryllium, copper and iron. In addition to its low coefficient of thermal expansion, its hardness (400 Brinell), nonmagnetizability, and resistance to deformation and damage make it suited for making precision parts that must have high dimensional stability. Glucydur is also resistant to corrosion; it is rather inert chemically.

Glucydur was developed about the same time as another non-magnetic material, Nivarox.
