= Thermotime switch =

A thermotime switch, or TTS, is a sensor used to control the cold start enrichment process in some older fuel injection systems. An extra injector is placed in the inlet manifold designed to feed all of the cylinders, and whilst the other injectors have flow rates controlled by pulse duration, the cold start injector stays on during the initial cold starting procedure.

This duration is controlled by the thermotime switch, which is a bimetallic strip based device placed in the water jacket or in the case of an air-cooled engine, in the engine/timing case. When an engine first starts, the coolant temperature is cold and the bimetallic strip is closed, which in turn supplies the cold start injector with current.

A small heater coil is built into the thermotime switch, which effectively gives a timed output to the cold start injector with the timing duration dependent on the temperature of the engine. If the engine is started whilst warm the bimetallic strip remains open due to the higher temperature, meaning the cold start routine is not entered.
