= Villarceau circles =

Intersection of a torus and a plane

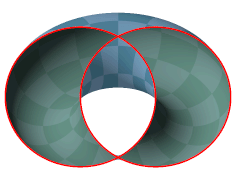
Villarceau circles as intersection of a torus and a plane

Cutting a torus with a special plane reveals a pair of circles, known as Villarceau circles. The cutting plane passes through the torus' center and touches the torus at two antipodal points; the circles intersect at these points.

In geometry, Villarceau circles (/viːlɑːrˈsoʊ/) are a pair of circles produced by cutting a torus obliquely through its center at a special angle.

Given an arbitrary point on a torus, four circles can be drawn through it. One is in a plane parallel to the equatorial plane of the torus and another perpendicular to that plane (these are analogous to lines of latitude and longitude on the Earth). The other two are Villarceau circles. They are obtained as the intersection of the torus with a plane that passes through the center of the torus and touches it tangentially at two antipodal points. If one considers all these planes, one obtains two families of circles on the torus. Each of these families consists of disjoint circles that cover each point of the torus exactly once and thus forms a 1-dimensional foliation of the torus.

The Villarceau circles are named after the French astronomer and mathematician Yvon Villarceau (1813–1883) who wrote about them in 1848.

== Example ==
Consider a horizontal torus in xyz space, centered at the origin and with major radius 5 and minor radius 3. That means that the torus is the locus of some vertical circles of radius three whose centers are on a circle of radius five in the horizontal xy plane. Points on this torus satisfy this equation:

$$0 = (x^2+y^2+z^2 + 16)^2 - 100(x^2+y^2). \,\!$$

Slicing with the z = 0 plane produces two concentric circles, x^{2} + y^{2} = 2^{2} and x^{2} + y^{2} = 8^{2}, the outer and inner equator. Slicing with the x = 0 plane produces two side-by-side circles, (y − 5)^{2} + z^{2} = 3^{2} and (y + 5)^{2} + z^{2} = 3^{2}.

Two example Villarceau circles can be produced by slicing with the plane 3y = 4z. One is centered at (+3, 0, 0) and the other at (−3, 0, 0); both have radius five. They can be written in parametric form as

$$(x,y,z) = (+3+5 \cos \vartheta,  4 \sin \vartheta, 3 \sin \vartheta) \,\!$$

and

$$(x,y,z) = (-3+5 \cos \vartheta,  4 \sin \vartheta, 3 \sin \vartheta) \,\!$$

The slicing plane is chosen to be tangent to the torus at two points while passing through its center. It is tangent at (0, 16/5, 12/5) and at (0, -16/5, -12/5). The angle of slicing is uniquely determined by the dimensions of the chosen torus. Rotating any one such plane around the z-axis gives all of the Villarceau circles for that torus.

== Existence and equations ==
Villarceau circles on a torus. For the bottom picture, the projection is orthogonal onto the section plane, hence the true shape of the circles appear.

Torus with two pencils of Villarceau circles

Villarceau circles (magenta, green) through a given point (red). For any point there exist 4 circles on the torus containing the point.

A proof of the circles’ existence can be constructed from the fact that the slicing plane is tangent to the torus at two points. One characterization of a torus is that it is a surface of revolution. Without loss of generality, choose a coordinate system so that the axis of revolution is the z axis (see the figure to the right). Begin with a circle of radius r in the yz plane, centered at (0, R, 0):
$$0 = (y - R)^2 + z^2 - r^2.$$
Sweeping this circle around the z axis replaces y by (x^{2} + y^{2})^{1/2}, and clearing the square root produces a quartic equation for the torus:
$$0 = (x^2 + y^2 + z^2 + R^2 - r^2)^2 - 4R^2(x^2 + y^2).$$
The cross-section of the swept surface in the yz plane now includes a second circle, with equation
$$0 = (y + R)^2 + z^2 - r^2.$$

This pair of circles has two common internal tangent lines, with slope at the origin found from the right triangle with hypotenuse R and opposite side r (which has its right angle at the point of tangency). Thus, on these tangent lines, z/y equals ±r/(R^{2} − r^{2})^{1/2}, and choosing the plus sign produces the equation of a plane bitangent to the torus:
$$y r = z\sqrt{R^2 - r^2}.$$
We can calculate the intersection of this plane with the torus analytically, and thus show that the result is a symmetric pair of circles of radius R centered at $(\pm r, 0, 0).$

A parametric description of these circles is
$$(x, y, z) = \Big({\pm r} + R \cos\vartheta,\ \sqrt{R^2 - r^2} \sin\vartheta,\ r \sin\vartheta\Big).$$

These circles can also be obtained by starting with a circle of radius R in the xy plane, centered at (r, 0, 0) or (−r, 0, 0), and then rotating this circle about the x axis by an angle of arcsin(r/R).

A treatment along these lines can be found in Coxeter (1969).

A more abstract – and more flexible – approach was described by Hirsch (2002), using algebraic geometry in a projective setting. In the homogeneous quartic equation for the torus,
$$0 = (x^2 + y^2 + z^2 + R^2 w^2 - r^2 w^2)^2 - 4R^2 w^2(x^2 + y^2),$$
setting w to zero gives the intersection with the “plane at infinity” and reduces the equation to
$$0 = (x^2 + y^2 + z^2)^2.$$
This intersection is a double point, in fact a double point counted twice. Furthermore, it is included in every bitangent plane. The two points of tangency are also double points. Thus the intersection curve, which theory says must be a quartic, contains four double points. But we also know that a quartic with more than three double points must factor (it cannot be irreducible), and by symmetry the factors must be two congruent conics, which are the two Villarceau circles.

Hirsch extends this argument to any surface of revolution generated by a conic and shows that intersection with a bitangent plane must produce two conics of the same type as the generator when the intersection curve is real.

== Filling space and the Hopf fibration ==
The torus plays a central role in the Hopf fibration of the 3-sphere, S^{3}, over the ordinary sphere, S^{2}, which has circles, S^{1}, as fibers. When the 3-sphere is mapped to Euclidean 3-space by stereographic projection, the inverse image of a circle of latitude on S^{2} under the fiber map is a torus, and the fibers themselves are Villarceau circles. Banchoff has explored such a torus with computer graphics imagery. One of the unusual facts about the circles making up the Hopf fibration is that each links through all the others, not just through the circles in its own torus but through the circles making up all the tori filling all of space; Berger has a discussion and drawing.

== Further properties ==
Mannheim (1903) showed that the Villarceau circles meet all of the parallel circular cross-sections of the torus at the same angle, a result that he said a Colonel Schoelcher had presented at a congress in 1891.

== See also ==
- Hopf fibration
- Toric section
- Vesica piscis
