= Recording thermometer =

Device that records temperature changes over time

A recording thermometer is a type of thermometer that records temperature changes over a period of time. A digital recording thermometer is often called a temperature data logger.

== Analog temperature recorders ==
A type of chart recorder, one end of a bi-metallic strip is attached to a long, light metal lever that holds a special pen. Tiny movements of the bimetallic strip cause much larger movements of the free end of the lever and the pen. The pen traces a rising and falling line on a strip of paper attached to a slowly turning drum. The drum usually makes one turn every seven or so days, so afterward each strip of paper contains a complete and accurate record of temperature changes for a whole week. The bimetallic strip is usually made from steel and copper. Because these metals expand and contract at different rates. When one of these metals expand it curls tighter, when one contracts it uncurls slightly. When it curls or uncurls, the data is converted into electric signals, which record the temperature change.

== Digital temperature recorders ==
Thermocouple or thermistors sensors coupled with data loggers are now more often used to sense and record temperatures and record them in a digital format easily used by computers. They are widely available and come in a variety of types and varying probes.
