= Elinvar =

Nickel–iron–chromium alloy

Elinvar is a nickel–iron–chromium alloy notable for having a modulus of elasticity which does not change much with temperature changes.

== Metal ==
The name is a contraction of the French élasticité invariable ('invariable elasticity'). It was invented by Charles Édouard Guillaume, a Swiss physicist who also invented Invar, another alloy of nickel and iron with very low thermal expansion. Guillaume won the 1920 Nobel Prize in Physics for these discoveries, which show how important these alloys were for scientific instruments.

Elinvar originally consisted of 52% iron, 36% nickel, and 12% chromium. It is almost non-magnetic, and corrosion resistant.

Other variations of the Elinvar alloy are

- Iron- and cobalt-based ferromagnetic Elinvar alloy
- Manganese- and chromium-based antiferromagnetic Elinvar alloy
- Palladium-based non-magnetic Elinvar alloy

The largest use of Elinvar was in balance springs for mechanical watches and chronometers. A major cause of inaccuracy in watches and clocks was that ordinary steels used in springs lost elasticity slightly as the temperature increased, so the balance wheel would oscillate more slowly back and forth, and the clock would lose time. Chronometers and precision watches required complex temperature-compensated balance wheels for accurate timekeeping. Springs made of Elinvar, and other low temperature coefficient alloys such as Nivarox that followed, were minimally affected by temperature, so they made the temperature-compensated balance wheel obsolete.
