= Nivaflex =

Cobalt alloy used in watchmaking

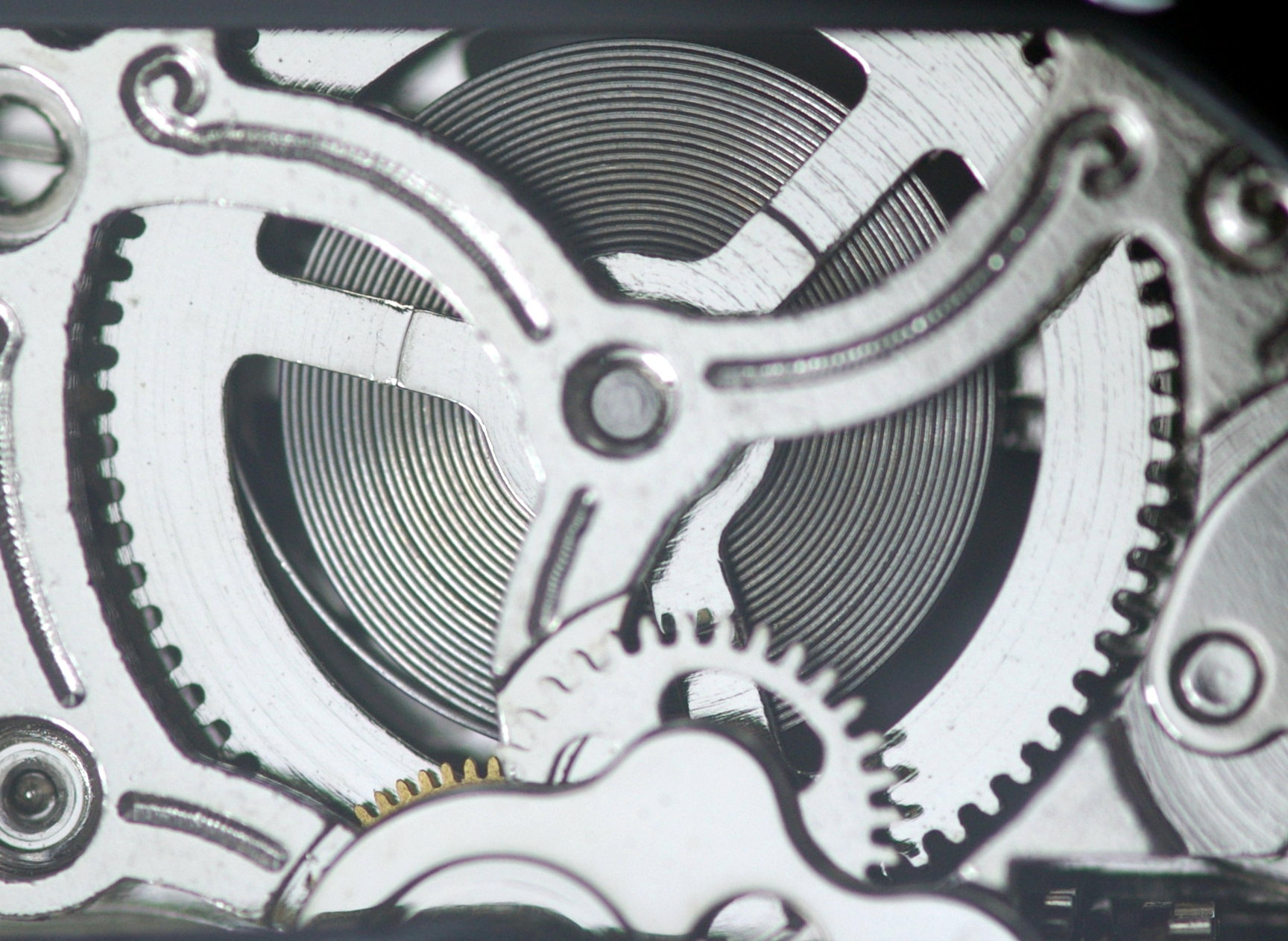
A watch mainspring

Nivaflex is an octavariant alloy important in watchmaking, used primarily for the mainspring. The name was registered as a trademark in 1957 by Reinhard Straumann, a Swiss metallurgist. Nivaflex is "wholly non-magnetic" and displays a very low coefficient of thermal expansion. Its composition is of 45% cobalt, 21% nickel, 18% chromium, 5% iron, 4% tungsten, 4% molybdenum, 1% titanium and 0.2% beryllium; carbon content is less than 0.1 percent of the alloy's weight.
