= Invar =

Alloy of nickel and iron with low coefficient of thermal expansion

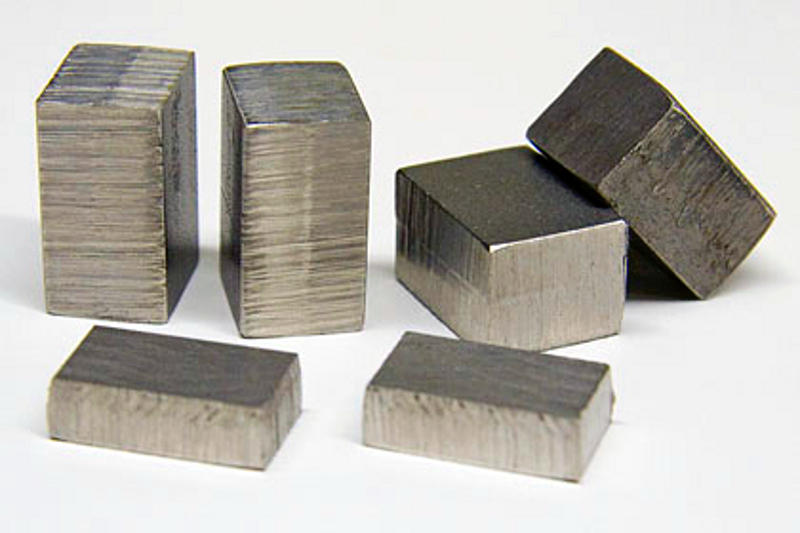
Samples of Invar

The coefficient of thermal expansion of nickel/iron alloys is plotted here against the nickel percentage (on a mass basis) in the alloy. The sharp minimum occurs at the Invar ratio of 36% Ni.

Invar, also known generically as FeNi36 (64FeNi in the US), is a nickel–iron alloy notable for its uniquely low coefficient of thermal expansion (CTE or α). The name Invar comes from the word invariable, referring to its relative lack of expansion or contraction with temperature changes, and is a registered trademark of ArcelorMittal.

The discovery of the alloy was made in 1895 by Swiss physicist Charles Édouard Guillaume for which he received the Nobel Prize in Physics in 1920. It enabled improvements in scientific instruments.

== Properties ==
Like other nickel/iron compositions, Invar is a solid solution; that is, it is a single-phase alloy. In one commercial grade called Invar 36 it consists of approximately 36% nickel and 64% iron, has a melting point of 1,427 °C (2,601 °F), a density of 8.05 g/cm^{3} and a resistivity of 8.2×10^{−5} Ω·cm. The invar range was described by Westinghouse scientists in 1961 as "30–45 atom per cent nickel".

Common grades of Invar have a coefficient of thermal expansion (denoted α, and measured between 20 °C and 100 °C) of about 1.2 × 10^{−6} K^{−1} (1.2 ppm/°C), while ordinary steels have values of around 11–15 ppm/°C. Extra-pure grades (<0.1% Co) can readily produce values as low as 0.62–0.65 ppm/°C. Some formulations display negative thermal expansion (NTE) characteristics. Though it displays high dimensional stability over a range of temperatures, it does have a propensity to creep.

Historically, the paramagnetic properties of certain iron-nickel alloys were first identified as a unique characteristic. These alloys exhibit a coexistence of two types of crystalline atomic structures, whose proportions vary depending on temperature. One of these structures is characterized by a high magnetic moment (ranging from 2.2 to 2.5 μ_{B}) and a high lattice parameter, adhering to Hund's rules. The other structure, in contrast, has a low magnetic moment (ranging from 0.8 to 1.5 μ_{B}) and a low lattice parameter. When exposed to a variable magnetic field, this dual-structure nature induces dimensional changes in the alloy. This phenomenon is particularly significant in the case of Invar alloys, which are renowned for their exceptional dimensional stability over a wide range of temperatures. However, to maintain this stability, it is crucial to avoid exposing the material to magnetic fields, as such exposure can disrupt the delicate balance between the two structures and lead to undesirable dimensional variations.

While Invar is renowned for its low CTE, which arises from the spontaneous volume magnetostriction (the Invar effect), it is historically less noted for its sensitivity to external magnetic fields. As a ferromagnetic material, standard Invar 36 possesses a relatively large positive saturation magnetostriction of approximately 4 ppm under 1-T magnetic field.This property, known as Joule magnetostriction, means that the material undergoes anisotropic dimensional changes when magnetized. Consequently, fluctuations in the ambient magnetic field—or even changing the orientation of an Invar component relative to the Earth's magnetic field—can induce linear strains. In ultra-precision applications such as interferometry or semiconductor lithography, these magnetically induced expansions can exceed the thermal stability limits the material was selected for. To mitigate this, sensitive instruments often require magnetic shielding or the substitution of Invar with specialized non-ferromagnetic low-expansion alloys.

In recent years, advancements in material science have led to the development of non-ferromagnetic Invar alloys. These innovative materials have opened up new possibilities for applications in cutting-edge fields such as the semiconductor industry and aerospace engineering. By eliminating the influence of magnetic fields on dimensional stability, non-ferromagnetic Invar alloys have the potential to significantly enhance the performance of optical instruments and other precision devices.

== Applications ==
Invar is used where high dimensional stability is required, such as precision instruments, clocks, seismic creep gauges, color-television tubes' shadow-mask frames, valves in engines and large aerostructure molds. Invar 36 can be processed by laser powder bed fusion (LPBF), which is of particular interest for composite-tooling and precision-instrument applications because the process can produce near-net-shape components whose low coefficient of thermal expansion is retained in the as-built condition. Additively manufactured Fe-36Ni has been shown to maintain an ultra-low coefficient of thermal expansion while reaching higher tensile strength than conventionally manufactured material, although the porosity and microstructure developed during processing influence both the thermal-expansion behaviour and the mechanical properties.

One of its first applications was in watch balance wheels and pendulum rods for precision regulator clocks. At the time it was invented, the pendulum clock was the world's most precise timekeeper, and the limit to timekeeping accuracy was due to thermal variations in length of clock pendulums. The Riefler regulator clock developed in 1898 by Clemens Riefler, the first clock to use an Invar pendulum, had an accuracy of 10 milliseconds per day, and served as the primary time standard in naval observatories and for national time services until the 1930s.

In land surveying, when first-order (high-precision) elevation leveling is to be performed, the level staff (leveling rod) used is made of Invar, instead of wood, fiberglass, or other metals. Invar struts were used in some pistons to limit their thermal expansion inside their cylinders. In the manufacture of large composite material structures for aerospace carbon fibre layup molds, Invar is used to facilitate the manufacture of parts to extremely tight tolerances.

In the astronomical field, Invar is used as the structural components that support dimension-sensitive optics of astronomical telescopes. Superior dimensional stability of Invar allows the astronomical telescopes to significantly improve the observation precision and accuracy.

== Variations ==
There are variations of the original Invar material that have slightly different coefficient of thermal expansion such as:

- Inovco, which is Fe–33Ni–4.5Co and has an α of 0.55 ppm/°C (from 20 to 100 °C).
- FeNi42 (for example NILO alloy 42), which has a nickel content of 42% and α ≈ 5.3 ppm/°C, matching that of silicon, is widely used as lead frame material for integrated circuits, etc.
- FeNiCo alloys—named Kovar or Dilver P—that have the same expansion behaviour (~5 ppm/°C) and form strong bonds with molten borosilicate glass, and because of that are used for glass-to-metal seals, and to support optical parts in a wide range of temperatures and applications, such as satellites.
- Elinvar has a near-constant modulus of elasticity, making it valuable for wristwatch balance wheels, spring scales, and other spring-based measuring instruments.

== Explanation of anomalous properties ==
A detailed explanation of Invar's anomalously low CTE has proven elusive for physicists.

All the iron-rich face-centered cubic Fe–Ni alloys show Invar anomalies in their measured thermal and magnetic properties that evolve continuously in intensity with varying alloy composition. Scientists had once proposed that Invar's behavior was a direct consequence of a high-magnetic-moment to low-magnetic-moment transition occurring in the face centered cubic Fe–Ni series (and that gives rise to the mineral antitaenite); however, this theory was proven incorrect. Instead, it appears that the low-moment/high-moment transition is preceded by a high-magnetic-moment frustrated ferromagnetic state in which the Fe–Fe magnetic exchange bonds have a large magneto-volume effect of the right sign and magnitude to create the observed thermal expansion anomaly.

Wang et al. considered the statistical mixture between the fully ferromagnetic (FM) configuration and the spin-flipping configurations (SFCs) in Fe_{3}Pt with the free energies of FM and SFCs predicted from first-principles calculations and were able to predict the temperature ranges of negative thermal expansion under various pressures. It was shown that all individual FM and SFCs have positive thermal expansion, and the negative thermal expansion originates from the increasing populations of SFCs with smaller volumes than that of FM.

== See also ==
- Constantan and Manganin, alloys with relatively constant electrical resistivity
- Elinvar, alloy with relatively constant elasticity over a range of temperatures
- Sitall and Zerodur, ceramic materials with a relatively low thermal expansion
- Borosilicate glass and Ultra low expansion glass, low expansion glasses resistant to thermal shock
- ALLVAR Alloy 30, a negative thermal expansion alloy that compensates for thermal expansion of other materials
