= Nivarox =

Swiss company

Nivarox, also known as Nivarox - FAR SA, is a Swiss company formed by a merger in 1984 between Nivarox SA and Fabriques d'Assortiments Réunis (FAR). It is currently owned by the Swatch Group. Nivarox is also the trade name of the metallic alloy from which its products are fabricated. Its notable property is that its coefficient of elasticity is remarkably constant with temperature. Nivarox is most famous for producing hairsprings that are attached to the balance wheel inside a mechanical watch movement, as well as mainsprings which provide the motive power for the watch.

Nivarox was developed for use in watch hairsprings in 1933 by Reinhard Straumann in his Waldenbourg laboratory. FAR was the corporate name chosen in 1932 for the entity comprising several companies and subsidiaries located in Le Locle Switzerland, which at the time manufactured various watch components.

== Nivarox alloy ==
As a trade name, Nivarox is an acronym from the German Nicht variabel oxydfest, 'Non-Variable Non-Oxidizing'. The Nivarox alloy is a nickel iron alloy used mainly in the watch industry for hairsprings for balance wheels, but also in other micro-machine industries and in certain medical equipment and surgical instruments, in the same category as Elinvar, Ni-Span, Vibralloy, Nivaflex and other similar alloys. The "non-variable" refers to the alloy's most notable property: that it has a low temperature coefficient of elasticity; its elasticity does not change much with temperature. There are several versions of the Nivarox alloy depending upon the intended application: Nivarox-CT, but also with suffixes CTC, M, W. Chemical compositions vary in wt% as follows for all Nivarox alloys : Iron as balance, a wide variation in nickel between 30-40%, beryllium 0.7-1%, some versions have molybdenum at 6-9% while others have instead chromium 8%, titanium is present in some compositions at 1%, manganese at 0.7-0.8%, silicon 0.1-0.2% and carbon in traces up to 0.2%. A typical composition would be for the early version Nivarox-CT (by wt %) : Fe 54%, Ni 38%, Cr 8%, Ti 1%, Si 0.2%, Mn 0.8%, Be 0.9%, C < 0.1%.

When used for critical watch components, the alloy reduces errors due to temperature variation. Hairsprings made of this alloy have a spring constant which does not vary with temperature, allowing the watch's balance wheel, its timekeeping element, to keep better time. Along with the earlier alloy Elinvar, this alloy made obsolete the expensive compensation balance used in precision timepieces in the 19th century. Nivarox springs are now used by most watchmakers worldwide, with a global market share of 90%. The alloys also see limited use for specific components of sensitive scientific instruments.
