= Yvon Villarceau =

French astronomer, mathematician, and engineer

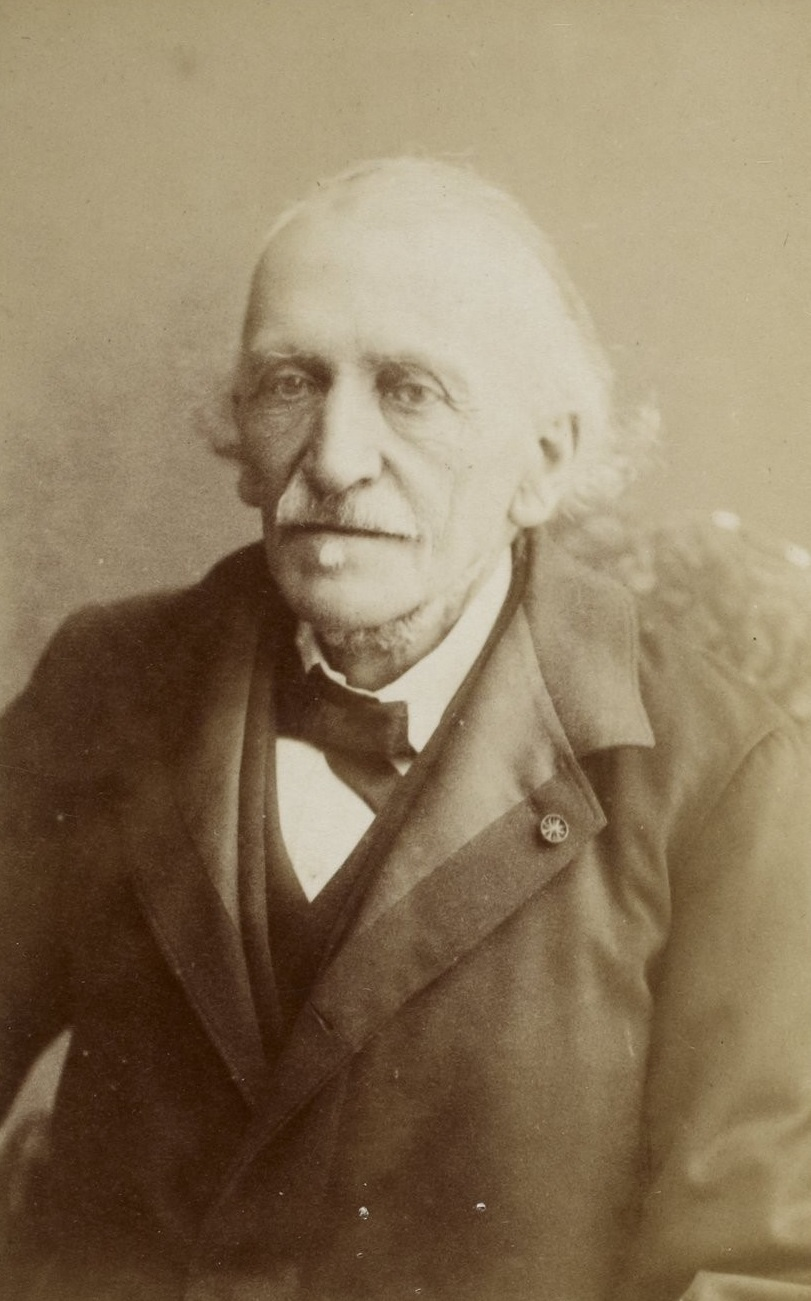
- Villarceau in 1883, photographed by Eugène Pirou
- Born: 15 January 1813; Vendome, France
- Died: 23 December 1883 (aged 70); Paris, France
- Education: École Centrale Paris
- Scientific career
- Fields: Mathematics, astronomy, engineering
- Workplaces: Paris Observatory

Antoine-Joseph Yvon Villarceau (15 January 1813 – 23 December 1883) was a French astronomer, mathematician, and engineer.

He constructed an equatorial meridian-instrument and an isochronometric regulator for the Paris Observatory.

He wrote Mécanique Céleste. Expose des Méthodes de Wronski et Composantes des Forces Perturbatrices suivant les Axes Mobiles (Paris: Gauthier-Villars, 1881) and Sur l'établissement des arches de pont, envisagé au point de vue de la plus grande stabilité (Paris: Imprimerie Impériale, 1853).

He is the eponym of Villarceau circles, which are two circular sections of a torus other than the two trivial ones.

A short street in the 16th arrondissement of Paris is named after Villarceau.

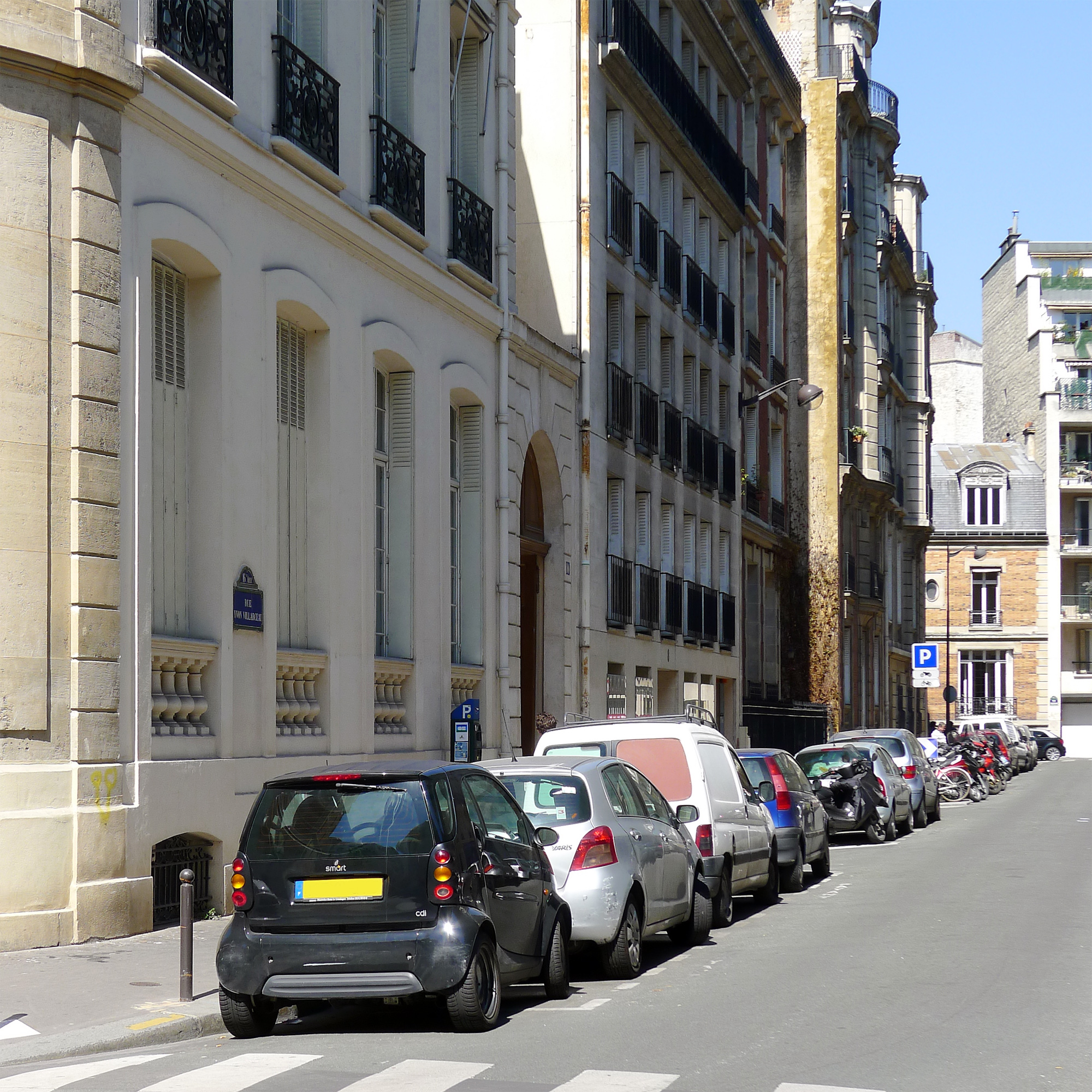
Rue Yvon-Villarceau in the 16th arrondissement in Paris

== Bibliography ==
- Debus, Allen G. (1968). World Who's Who in Science: A Biographical Dictionary of Notable Scientists from Antiquity to the Present. Chicago: Marquis-Who's Who. p. 1840.
