= Balance spring =

Spring attached to the balance wheel in timepieces

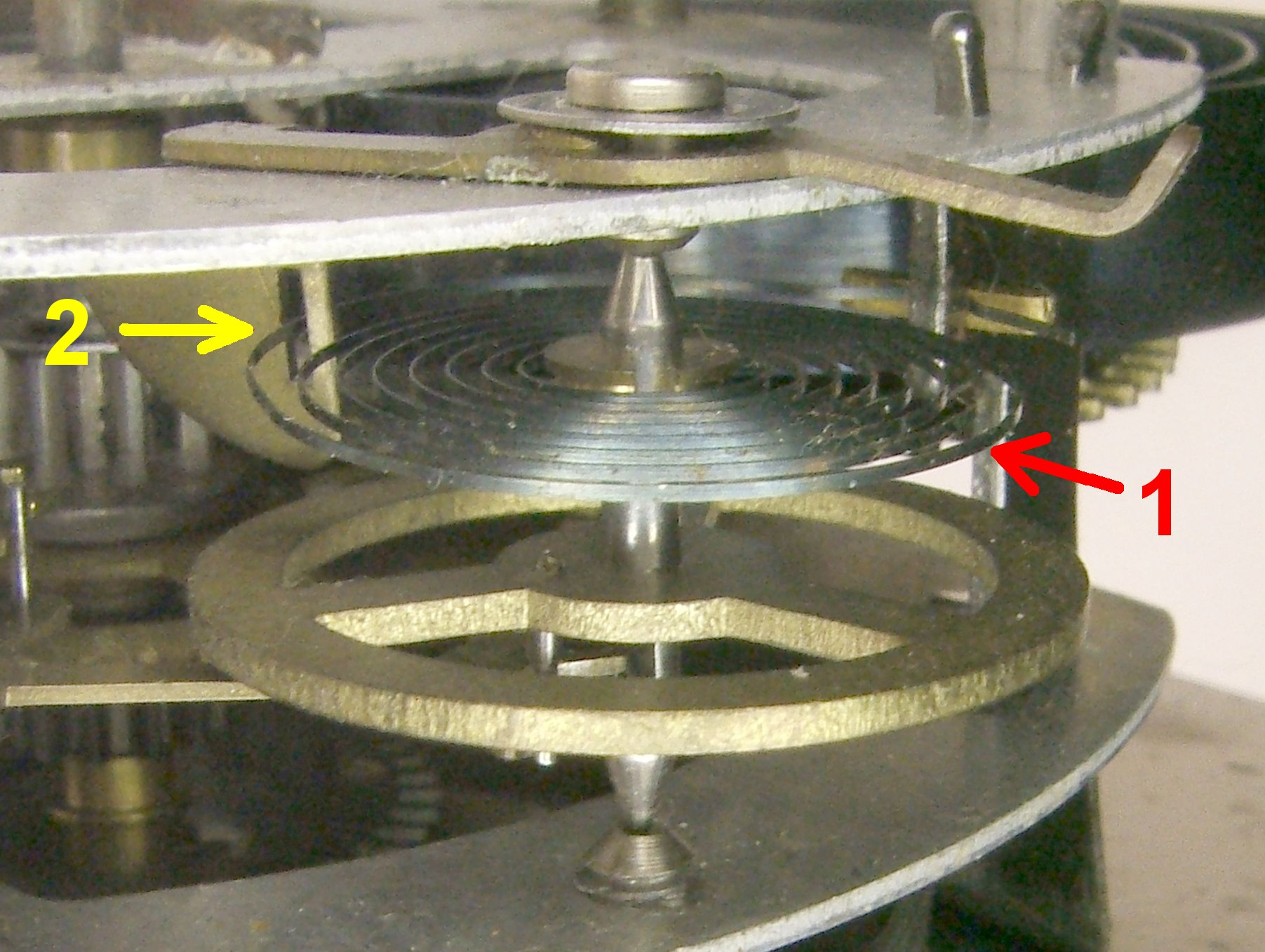
Balance wheel in a 1950s alarm clock, showing the (1) balance spring and (2) regulator.

Clip of operating balance wheel in a mantel clock, showing motion of balance spring (top center)

A balance spring, or hairspring, is a spring attached to the balance wheel in mechanical timepieces. It causes the balance wheel to oscillate with a resonant frequency when the timepiece is running, which controls the speed at which the wheels of the timepiece turn, thus the rate of movement of the hands. A regulator lever is often fitted, which can be used to alter the free length of the spring and thereby adjust the rate of the timepiece. The balance spring is an essential adjunct to the balance wheel, causing it to oscillate back and forth. The balance spring and balance wheel together form a harmonic oscillator, which oscillates with a precise period or "beat" resisting external disturbances and is responsible for timekeeping accuracy.

The addition of the balance spring to the balance wheel around 1657 by Robert Hooke and Christiaan Huygens greatly increased the accuracy of portable timepieces, transforming early pocketwatches from expensive novelties to useful timekeepers. Improvements to the balance spring are responsible for further large increases in accuracy since that time. Modern balance springs are made of special low temperature coefficient alloys like nivarox to reduce the effects of temperature changes on the rate, and carefully shaped to minimize the effect of changes in drive force as the mainspring runs down. Before the 1980s, balance wheels and balance springs were used in virtually every portable timekeeping device: alarm clocks, kitchen timers, marine chronometers, time-controlled appliances like washing machines, bank vault time locks, time fuzes on military munitions, but in recent decades electronic quartz timekeeping technology has replaced mechanical clockwork in most of these devices, and the major remaining use of balance springs is in mechanical watches.

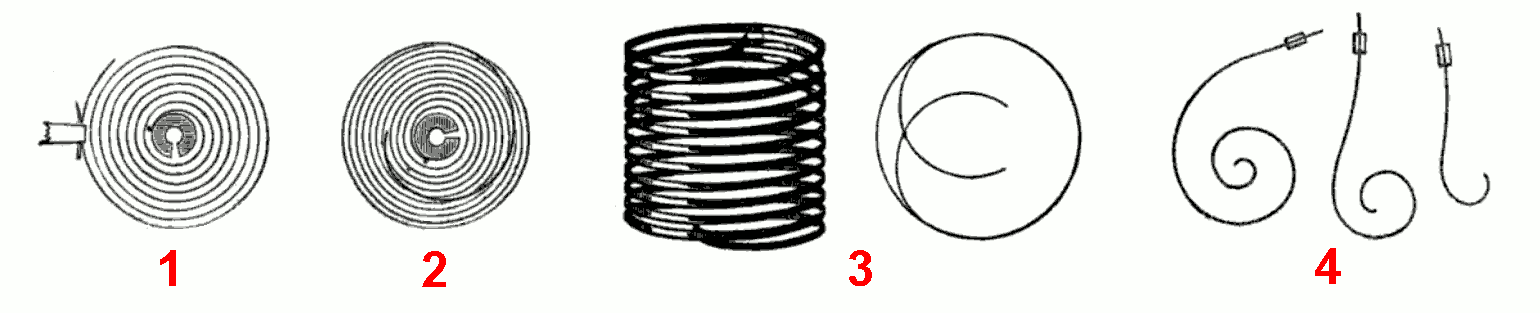
Types of balance springs: 1. flat spiral; 2. Breguet overcoil; 3. chronometer helix showing curving ends, 4. early balance springs

== History ==
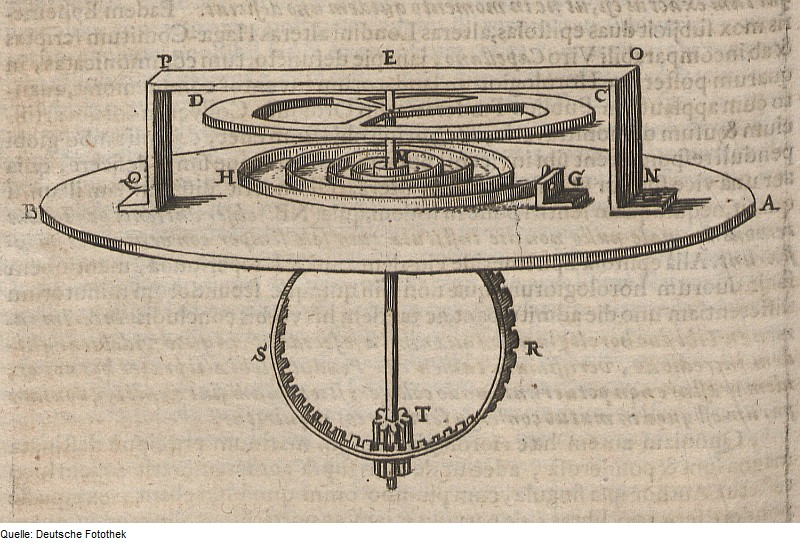
Drawing of one of his first balance springs, attached to a balance wheel, by Christiaan Huygens.

There is some dispute as to whether it was invented in the mid 1670s by British physicist Robert Hooke or Dutch scientist Christiaan Huygens, with the likelihood being that Hooke first had the idea, but Huygens built the first functioning watch that used a balance spring. Priority is also claimed for Huygens's craftsman, Isaac II Thuret, as the first to construct a working timepiece with this technology. Before that time, balance wheels or foliots without springs were used in clocks and watches, but they were very sensitive to fluctuations in the driving force, causing the timepiece to slow down as the mainspring unwound. The introduction of the balance spring effected an enormous increase in the accuracy of pocketwatches, from perhaps several hours per day to 10 minutes per day, making them useful timekeepers for the first time. The first balance springs had only a few turns.

A few early watches had a Barrow regulator, which used a worm drive, but the first widely used regulator was invented by Thomas Tompion around 1680. In the Tompion regulator the curb pins were mounted on a semicircular toothed rack, which was adjusted by fitting a key to a cog and turning it. The modern regulator, a lever pivoted concentrically with the balance wheel, was patented by Joseph Bosley in 1755, but it didn't replace the Tompion regulator until the early 19th century.

== Regulator ==
In order to adjust the rate, the balance spring usually has a regulator. The regulator is a moveable lever mounted on the balance cock or bridge, pivoted coaxially with the balance. A narrow slot is formed on one end of the regulator by two downward projecting pins, called curb pins, or by a curb pin and a pin with a heavier section called a boot. The end of the outer turn of the balance spring is fixed in a stud which is secured to the balance cock. The outer turn of the spring then passes through the regulator slot. The portion of the spring between the stud and the slot is held stationary, so the position of the slot controls the free length of the spring. Moving the regulator slides the slot along the outer turn of the spring, changing its effective length. Moving the slot away from the stud shortens the spring, making it stiffer, increasing the balance's oscillation rate, and making the timepiece gain time.

The regulator interferes slightly with the motion of the spring, causing inaccuracy, so precision timepieces like marine chronometers and some high end watches are free sprung, meaning they don't have a regulator. Instead, their rate is adjusted by timing screws on the balance wheel.

There are two principal types of balance spring regulator:

- The Tompion regulator, in which the curb pins are mounted on a sector-rack, moved by a pinion. The pinion is usually fitted with a graduated silver or steel disc.
- The Bosley regulator, as described above, in which the Pins are mounted on a lever pivoted coaxially with the Balance, the extremity of the lever being able to be moved over a graduated scale. There are several variants which improve the accuracy with which lever can be moved, including the snail regulator, in which the lever is sprung against a cam of spiral profile which can be turned, the Micrometer, in which the lever is moved by a worm gear, and the swan's neck or reed regulator in which the position of the lever is adjusted by a fine screw, the lever being held in contact with the screw by a spring in the shape of a curved swans neck. This was invented and patented by the American George P. Reed, US patent No. 61,867 dated February 5, 1867.

There is also a hog's hair or pig's bristle regulator, in which stiff fibres are positioned at the extremities of the balance's arc and bring it to a gentle halt before throwing it back. The watch is accelerated by shortening the arc. This is not a balance spring regulator, being used in the earliest watches before the balance spring was invented.

There is also a Barrow regulator, but this is really the earlier of the two principal methods of giving the mainspring "set-up tension"; that required to keep the fusée chain in tension but not enough to actually drive the Watch. Verge watches can be regulated by adjusting the set-up tension, but if any of the previously described regulators is present then this is not usually done.

== Material ==
A number of materials have been used for balance springs. Early on, steel was used, but without any hardening or tempering process applied; as a result, these springs would gradually weaken and the watch would start losing time. Some watchmakers, for example John Arnold, used gold, which avoids the problem of corrosion but retains the problem of gradual weakening. Hardened and tempered steel was first used by John Harrison and subsequently remained the material of choice until the 20th century.

In 1833, E. J. Dent (maker of the Great Clock of the Houses of Parliament) experimented with a glass balance spring. This was much less affected by heat than steel, reducing the compensation required, and also didn't rust. Other trials with glass springs revealed that they were difficult and expensive to make, and they suffered from a widespread perception of fragility, which persisted until the time of fibreglass and fibre-optic materials. Hairsprings made of etched silicon were introduced in the late 20th century and are not susceptible to magnetisation.

== Effect of temperature ==
The modulus of elasticity of materials is dependent on temperature. For most materials, this temperature coefficient is large enough that variations in temperature significantly affect the timekeeping of a balance wheel and balance spring. The earliest makers of watches with balance springs, such as Hooke and Huygens, observed this effect without finding a solution to it.

Harrison, in the course of his development of the marine chronometer, solved the problem by a "compensation curb" – essentially a bimetallic thermometer which adjusted the effective length of the balance spring as a function of temperature. While this scheme worked well enough to allow Harrison to meet the standards set by the Longitude Act, it was not widely adopted.

Around 1765, Pierre Le Roy (son of Julien Le Roy) invented the compensation balance, which became the standard approach for temperature compensation in watches and chronometers. In this approach, the shape of the balance is altered, or adjusting weights are moved on the spokes or rim of the balance, by a temperature-sensitive mechanism. This changes the moment of inertia of the balance wheel, and the change is adjusted such that it compensates for the change in modulus of elasticity of the balance spring. The compensating balance design of Thomas Earnshaw, which consists simply of a balance wheel with bimetallic rim, became the standard solution for temperature compensation.

=== Elinvar ===
While the compensating balance was effective as a way to compensate for the effect of temperature on the balance spring, it could not provide a complete solution. The basic design suffers from "middle temperature error": if the compensation is adjusted to be exact at extremes of temperature, then it will be slightly off at temperatures between those extremes. Various "auxiliary compensation" mechanisms were designed to avoid this, but they all suffer from being complex and hard to adjust.

Around 1900, a fundamentally different solution was created by Charles Édouard Guillaume, inventor of elinvar. This is a nickel-steel alloy with the property that the modulus of elasticity is essentially unaffected by temperature. A watch fitted with an elinvar balance spring requires either no temperature compensation at all, or very little. This simplifies the mechanism, and it also means that middle temperature error is eliminated as well, or at a minimum is drastically reduced.

== Isochronism ==
A balance spring obeys Hooke's law: the restoring torque is proportional to the angular displacement. When this property is exactly satisfied, the balance spring is said to be isochronous, and the period of oscillation is independent of the amplitude of oscillation. This is an essential property for accurate timekeeping, because no mechanical drive train can provide absolutely constant driving force. This is particularly true in watches and portable clocks which are powered by a mainspring, which provides a diminishing drive force as it unwinds. Another cause of varying driving force is friction, which varies as the lubricating oil ages.

Early watchmakers empirically found approaches to make their balance springs isochronous. For example, Arnold in 1776 patented a helical (cylindrical) form of the balance spring, in which the ends of the spring were coiled inwards. In 1861 M. Phillips published a theoretical treatment of the problem. He demonstrated that a balance spring whose center of gravity coincides with the axis of the balance wheel is isochronous.

In general practice, the most common method of achieving isochronism is through the use of the Breguet overcoil, which places part of the outermost turn of the hairspring in a different plane from the rest of the spring. This allows the hairspring coil to expand and contract more evenly and symmetrically as the balance wheel rotates. Two types of overcoils are found – the gradual overcoil and the Z-Bend. The gradual overcoil is obtained by imposing two gradual twists to the hairspring, forming the rise to the second plane over half the circumference. The Z-bend does this by imposing two kinks of complementary 45 degree angles, accomplishing a rise to the second plane in about three spring section heights. The second method is done for aesthetic reasons and is much more difficult to perform. Due to the difficulty with forming an overcoil, modern watches often use a slightly less effective "dogleg", which uses a series of sharp bends (in plane) to place part of the outermost coil out of the way of the rest of the spring.

== Period of oscillation ==
The balance spring and the balance wheel (which is usually referred to as simply the balance) form a harmonic oscillator. The balance spring provides a restoring torque that limits and reverses the motion of the balance so it oscillates back and forth. Its resonant period makes it resistant to changes from perturbing forces, which is what makes it a good timekeeping device. The stiffness of the spring, its spring coefficient, $\kappa\,$ in N·m/radian, along with the balance wheel's moment of inertia, $I\,$ in kg·m^{2}, determines the wheel's oscillation period $T\,$. The equations of motion for the balance are derived from the angular form of Hooke's law and the angular form of Newton's second law:
$$\tau = -\kappa\theta = I\alpha\,\ .$$

$\alpha\,$ is the angular acceleration, $d^2 \theta\,/dt^2$. The following differential equation for the motion of the wheel results from rearranging the above equation:
$$\frac{d^2\theta}{dt^2} + \frac{\kappa}{I}\theta =  0\,$$

The solution to this equation of motion for the balance is simple harmonic motion; i.e., a sinusoidal motion of constant period:
$$\theta(t) = A\cos\left(\sqrt{\frac{\kappa}{I}}t\right) + B\sin\left(\sqrt{\frac{\kappa}{I}}t\right)\,$$

Thus, the following equation for the periodicity of oscillation can be extracted from the above results:
$$T = 2\pi\sqrt{\frac{I}{\kappa}}\,$$
This period controls the rate of the timepiece.

== See also ==
- History of timekeeping devices
