= Thermal equation of state of solids =

In physics, the thermal equation of state is a mathematical expression of pressure P, temperature T, and, volume V. The thermal equation of state for ideal gases is the ideal gas law, expressed as PV=nRT (where R is the gas constant and n the amount of substance), while the thermal equation of state for solids is expressed as:
$$P(V, T) = P(V, T_0) + P_\text{th}(V, T)$$
where $P(V, T_0)$ is the volume dependence of pressure at room temperature (isothermal), and $P_\text{th}(V, T)$ is the temperature dependence of pressure at constant volume (isochoric), known as thermal pressure.

For the ideal gas at high pressure-temperature (high P-T), the soft gas is filled in a solid firm container, and the gas is restrained inside the container; while for a solid at high P-T, a solid is loaded inside the soft medium, and the solid can expands/shrinks in the soft medium when heated and compressed. Therefore, the compression/heating process of the gas could be either constant temperature (isothermal), constant pressure (isobaric) or constant volume (isochoric). Though the compression/heating process of solids can be constant temperature (isothermal), and constant pressure (isobaric), it can not be a constant volume (isochoric), At high P-T, the pressure for the ideal gas is calculated by the force divided by the area, while the pressure for the solid is calculated from bulk modulus (K, or B) and volume at room temperature, or from Eq (1) at high P-T. A pressure gauge's bulk modulus is known, and its thermal equation of state is well known. To study a solid with unknown bulk modulus, it has to be loaded with a pressure gauge, and its pressure will be determined from its pressure gauge.

The most common pressure gauges are Au, Pt, Cu, and MgO, etc. When two or more pressure gauges are loaded together at high P-T, their pressure readings should be the same. However, large discrepancies have been reported in pressure determination using different pressure gauges or different thermal equations of state for the same pressure gauge. Fig.1 is a schematic plot showing the discrepancy in paper.

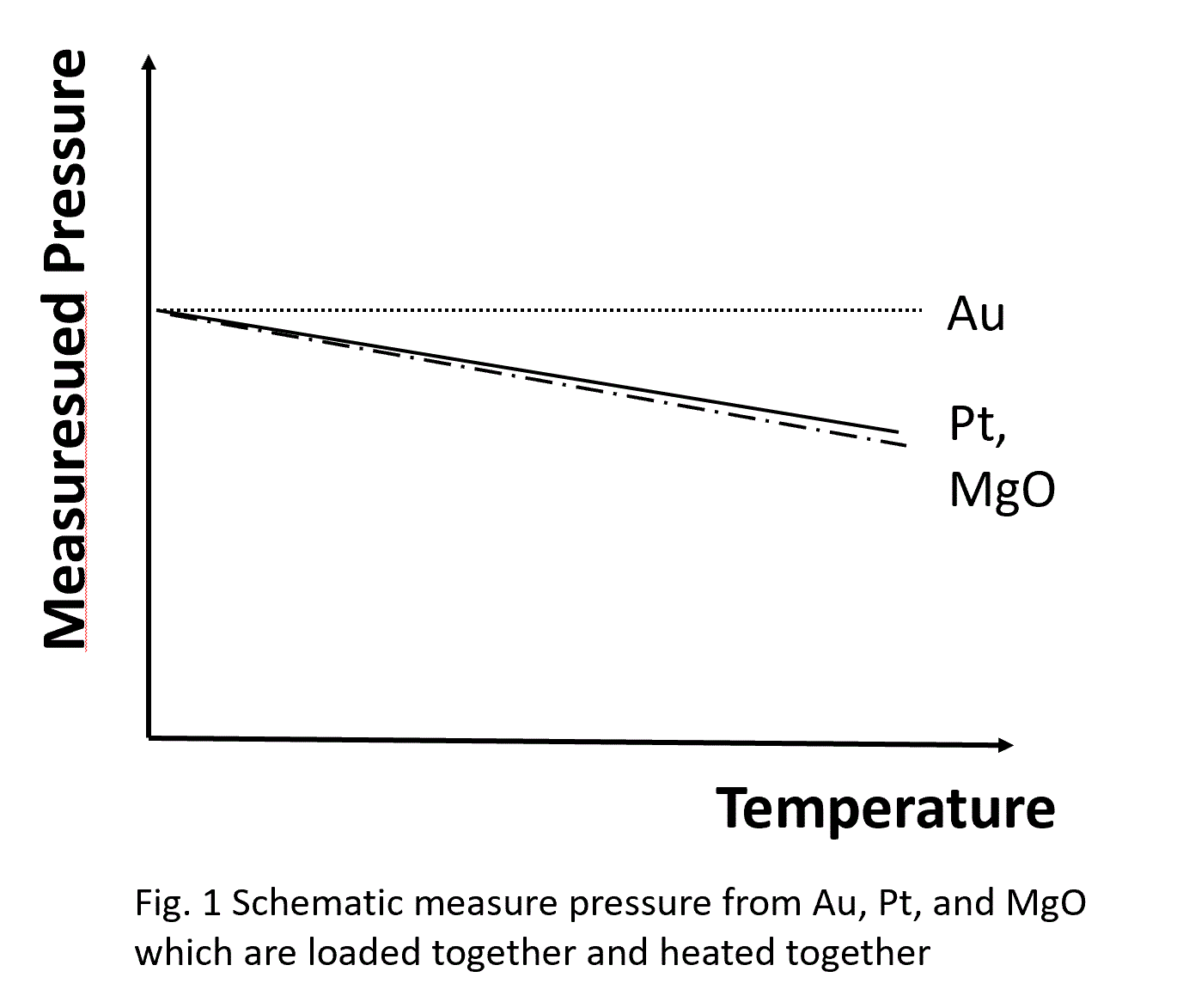

Out of the total pressure in Eq.(1), the first term pressures on the right side of Ag, Cu, Mo, Pd at room temperature are consistent in a wide pressure range, according to the Mao ruby scale up to 1 Mba. In addition, the first term pressure of Ag, Cu, and MgO are consistent according to third-order Birch–Murnaghan equation of state. Therefore, the discrepancy of the total pressure, P(V, T), should be from the second term in Eq. 1, which is the thermal pressure P_{th}(V, T) at high P-T.

== Thermal pressure ==
=== Anderson thermal pressure model ===
In 1968, Anderson developed (∂T/∂P)_{v}=(αK)^{−1} for the thermal gradient, and its reciprocal correlate the thermal pressure and temperature in a constant volume heating process by (∂P/∂T)_{v}=αK . Note, thermal pressure is the pressure change in a constant volume heating process, and expressed by integration of αK.

Anderson thermal pressure model is the first thermal pressure model and it is the most common thermal pressure model as well.

=== Experimental ===
The thermal pressure is the pressure change in a constant volume heating. In the section above, there are large discrepancies in pressure determination using different pressure gauges or different thermal equations of state for the same pressure gauge, however, the pressure determination in the heating process need to be reliable to measure the thermal pressure in experiments. In addition, to measure the thermal pressure in experiments, the heating process has to be a volume constant (isochoric) process. According to the first section above, a heating for a solid can not be an isochoric, so the pressure change in a non-isochoric heating process is not exactly the thermal pressure.

When a solid is loaded with a pressure gauge, and heated/compressed together at high P-T, the thermal pressure of the solid does not equal that of its gauge. The pressure is a state variable, while the thermal pressure is a process variable. A solid is subject to the same pressure as its gauge, In a heating process from T_{1} to T_{2}, if the solid's volume is kept constant by compression, most likely its pressure gauge's volume will not be constant in the same heating process. In paper, the authors demonstrate that, α_{sample}≠α_{gauge}, and K_{sample}≠K_{gauge}, so

$$\int\alpha_{\text{sample}}K_{\text{sample}}\mathrm d T\neq\int \alpha_{\text{gauge}}K_{\text{gauge}}\mathrm d T,$$

which means the thermal pressure of a solid doesn't equal that of its gauge.

=== Determination from models ===
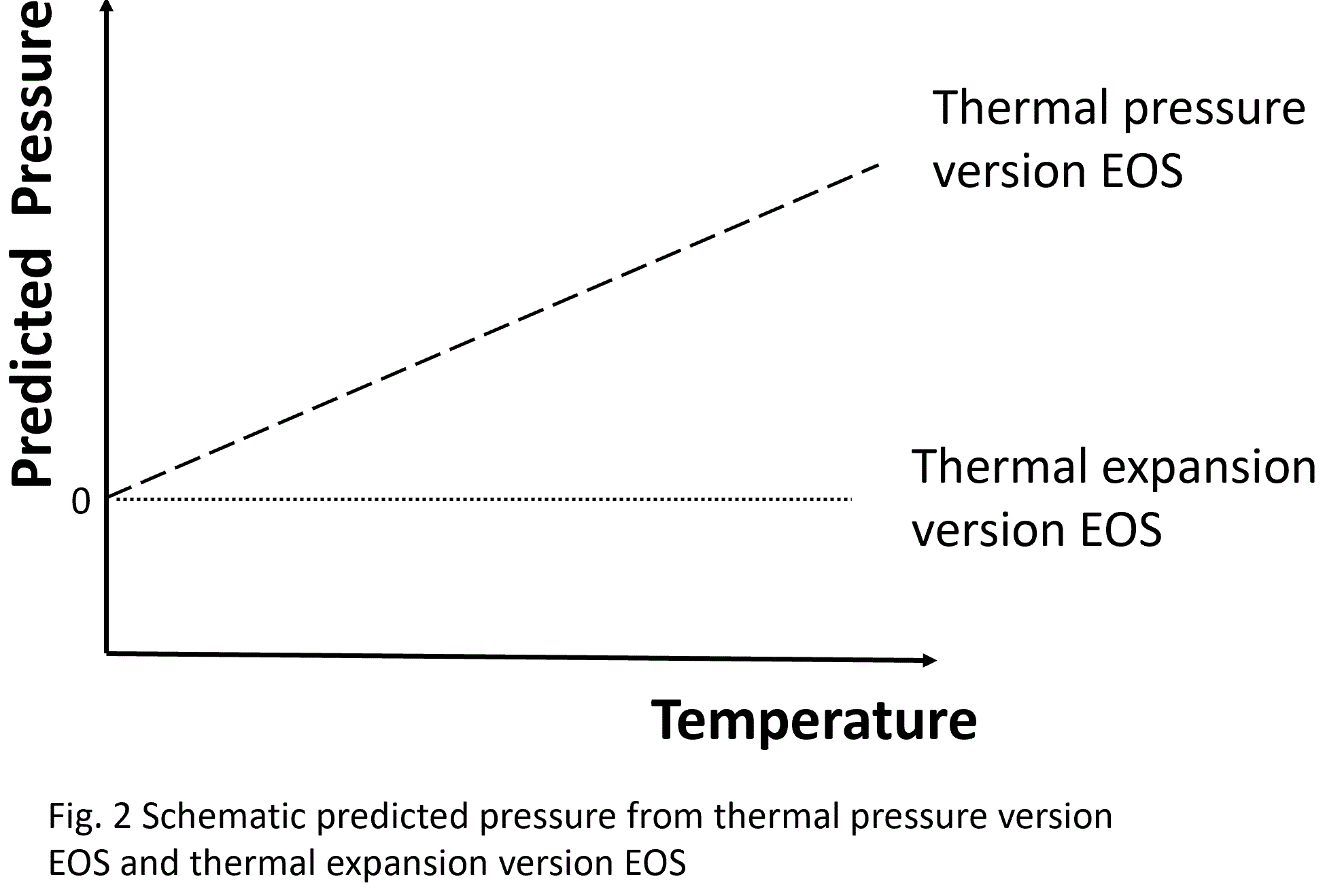

According to the Anderson model, thermal pressure is the integration of the product thermal expansion α_{p} and bulk modulus K_{T}, i.e. P_{th}=∫αKdt. In this model, both α_{p} and K_{T} are pressure dependent and temperature dependent, so integrating the α_{p} and K_{T} in an isochoric process over temperature is not straight forward. To bypass this issue, the P-T dependent α_{p} and K_{T} are assumed to constant α_{0} and K_{0}. But authors in publication demonstrated that the model predicted pressure of Au and MgO from constant α_{0} and K_{0} at ambient pressure deviate from its experimental values, and the higher temperature, the higher deviation. A cartoon plot for the pressures predicted from thermal pressure version equation of state in paper is shown in Fig. 2 here.

Authors in paper proposed an alternate way to make the integration of α_{p}K_{T} possible. They assumes the thermal expansion to be pressure independent, and reduce the P-T dependent α_{p} and K_{T} to only temperature dependent. But in a preprint paper, author proved that pressure independent thermal expansion leads to the bulk modulus to be temperature independent, which again reduce the P-T dependent α_{p} and K_{T} to constant α_{0} and K_{0}.

There are various other thermal pressure models, but accurately determined thermal pressures are required to prove these models.

== Pressure-dependent thermal expansion equation of state ==
It was explained that the thermal pressure can not be accurately determined in experiments in section "The thermal pressure from an experiment" above, and the thermal pressure can't accurately calculated from Anderson model above.Thermal expansion equation of state has been proposed before, which consists of a thermal expansion at ambient pressure and followed by an isothermal compression at high temperature. In this model, there is no thermal pressure term, but accurate pressure determination high P-T and temperature dependent K_{T} are of big challenge at the present. In paper, the authors proposed a different thermal expansion equation of state, which consists of isothermal compression at room temperature, following by thermal expansion at high pressure. To distinguish these two thermal expansion equations of state, the latter one is called pressure-dependent thermal expansion equation of state.

To develop the pressure-dependent thermal expansion equation of state, in an compression process at room temperature from (V_{0}, T_{0}, P_{0}) to (V_{1}, T_{0},P_{1}), a general form of volume is expressed as

$V_1 = f (T_0,P,V_0,K_0,K_0')$ .................................(1)

f in the above expression is the mathematical relation between volume and temperature, pressure. It could be expressed by various models, such as Murnaghan, modified Tait, natural strain, Vinet, Birch-Murnaghan, and others. Its inverse function of pressure can be written as

$P = f^{-1} (T_0,V_1,V_0,K_0,K_0')$ ............................(2)

The thermal expansion in an isobaric heating process from (V_{1}, T_{0}, P) to (V, T_{2},P) can be expressed as

V_{1}= V·exp(-∫_{T_{0}}^{T2}α_{p}·dx).......................................................(3)

The authors integrate the thermal expansion formula Eq. (3) into Eq. (2), and call V·exp(-∫α_{p}·dx) as V_{M}, and yield the general form of thermal expansion equation of state from (V_{0}, T_{0}, P_{0}) to (V, T_{2},P)

$P=f^{-1} (T_2,V_M,V_0,K_0,K_0')$ ...........................(4)

Here V is the volume after the isobaric heating. In paper, authors explained in detail how to develop Eq (4), and took the third order Birch Murnaghan as an example.

$$P_{V,T}={\frac{3K_0}{2}}[({\frac{V_0}{V_M}})^{\frac{7}{3}}-({\frac{V_0}{V_M}})^{\frac{5}{3}}].[1+{\frac{3}{4}}(K_0-4)(({\frac{V_0}{V_M}})^{\frac{2}{3}}-1)]$$

To partially prove the pressure-dependent thermal expansion equation of state, the authors collected a set of MgO x-ray diffraction data at various temperatures at ambient pressure. At ambient pressure, P=0 GPA is known, so, the volume, pressure, and temperature are all given. Then, authors predict the pressure value from the given (V, T) from pressure-dependent thermal expansion equation of state. The predicted pressures match with the known experimental value of 0 GPa, see in Figure 2. In addition of MgO, the authors demonstrate that the Au has a similar trend as well. In the future, the validation of the pressure-dependent thermal expansion equation of state at high P-T conditions is required.

The pressure dependent α_{p} has to be determined from an isobaric heating process. It has been reported that the heating in DAC with membrane at high P-T were isobaric. Authors in the paper propose a reversible isobaric heating concept, in which the plotted heating data points and cooling data points line on the same curve. Authors consider this heating and cooling process very close to the ideal isobaric. A cartoon plot of reversible heating/cooling proposed in paper is shown as Fig. 3.

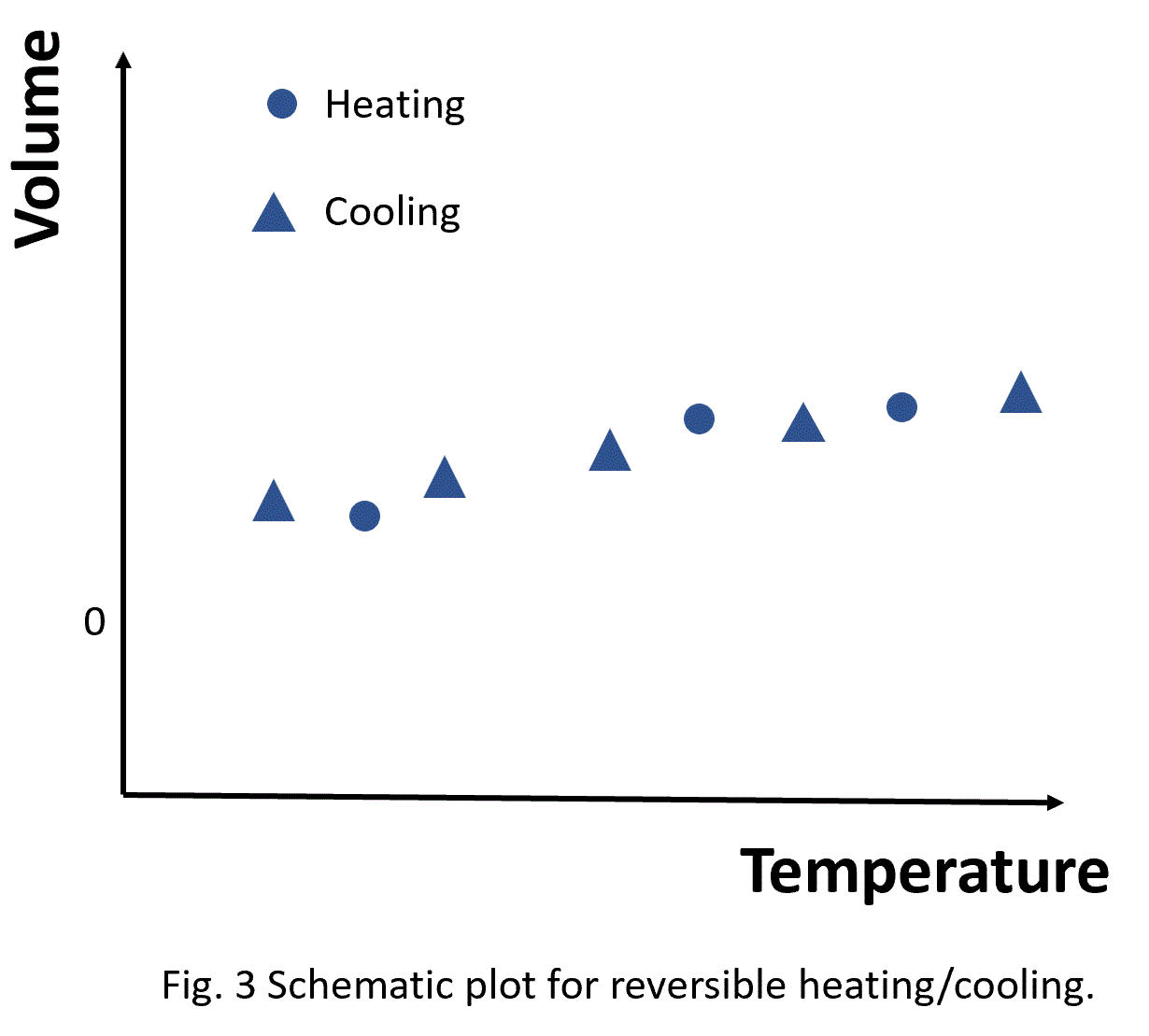

In paper, the authors demonstrated the reversible isobaric heating concept by MgO at 9.5 GPa. In a reversible heating process, no pressure determination at high P-T is required, thus, avoid the difficulty of accurately determining the pressure at high P-T.
