= Red giant =

Type of large cool star

A red giant is a luminous giant star of low or intermediate mass (roughly 0.3–8 solar masses (M_{☉})) in a late phase of stellar evolution. The outer atmosphere is inflated and tenuous, making the radius large and the surface temperature around 5,000 K [K] (4,700 °C; 8,500 °F) or lower. The appearance of the red giant is from yellow-white to reddish-orange, including the spectral types K and M, sometimes G, but also class S stars and most carbon stars.

Red giants vary in the way by which they generate energy:

- Stars on the red-giant branch (RGB) are still fusing hydrogen into helium in a shell surrounding an inert helium core.
- Red-clump stars in the cool half of the horizontal branch fuse helium into carbon in their cores via the triple-alpha process.
- Asymptotic-giant-branch (AGB) stars have a helium-burning shell outside a degenerate carbon–oxygen core, and a hydrogen-burning shell just beyond that.

Many of the well-known bright stars are red giants because they are luminous and moderately common. The K0 RGB star Arcturus is 36 light-years away, and Gacrux is the nearest M-class giant at 88 light-years' distance.

A red giant will usually produce a planetary nebula and become a white dwarf at the end of its life.

== Characteristics ==
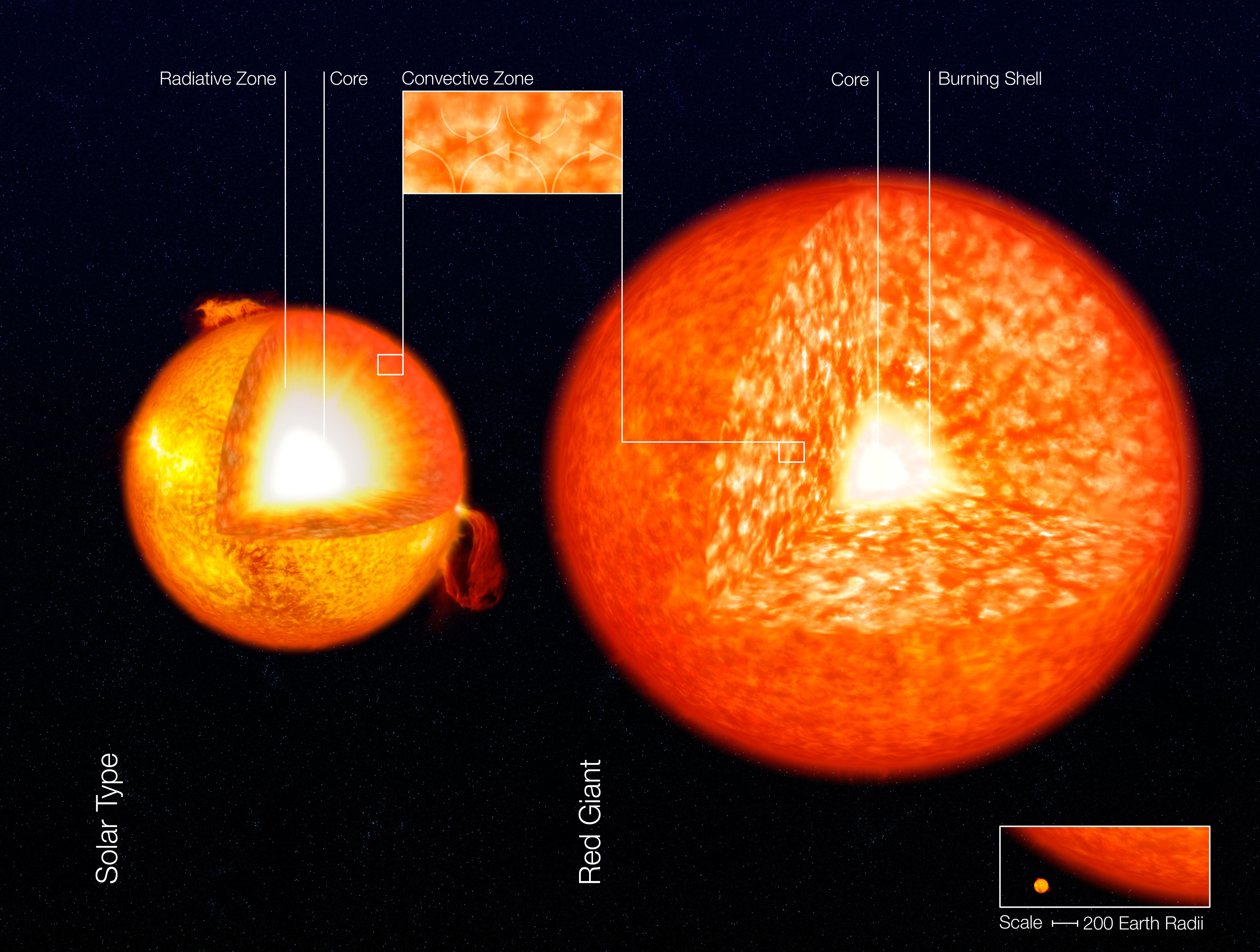
An illustration comparing the structure of the Sun (left) and its possible future as a red giant (right; not to scale, this image is of a false color for more contrast and does not depict stellar mass loss and the asymmetry of a red giant and the Sun is actually beige-white; an actual red giant would be orange-white to human eyes). The inset at the bottom right shows a size comparison.

A red giant is a star that has exhausted the supply of hydrogen in its core and has begun thermonuclear fusion of hydrogen in a shell surrounding the core. They have radii tens to hundreds of times larger than that of the Sun. However, their outer envelope is lower in temperature, giving them a yellowish-orange hue. Despite the lower energy density of their envelope, red giants are many times more luminous than the Sun because of their sheer size. Red-giant-branch stars have luminosities up to nearly three thousand times that of the Sun (L_{☉}); spectral types of K or M have surface temperatures of 3,000–4,000 K (compared with the Sun's photosphere temperature of nearly 6,000 K) and radii up to about 200 times the Sun (R_{☉}). Stars on the horizontal branch are hotter, with only a small range of luminosities around 75 L_{☉}. Asymptotic-giant-branch stars range from similar luminosities as the brighter stars of the red-giant branch, up to several times more luminous at the end of the thermal pulsing phase.

Among the asymptotic-giant-branch stars belong the carbon stars of type C-N and late C-R, produced when carbon and other elements are convected to the surface in what is called a dredge-up. The first dredge-up occurs during hydrogen shell burning on the red-giant branch, but does not produce a large carbon abundance at the surface. The second, and sometimes third, dredge-up occurs during helium shell burning on the asymptotic-giant branch and convects carbon to the surface in sufficiently massive stars.

The stellar limb of a red giant is not sharply defined, contrary to their depiction in many illustrations. Rather, due to the very low mass density of the envelope, such stars lack a well-defined photosphere, and the body of the star gradually transitions into a 'corona'. The coolest red giants have complex spectra, with molecular lines, emission features, and sometimes masers, particularly from thermally pulsing AGB stars. Observations have also provided evidence of a hot chromosphere above the photosphere of red giants, where investigating the heating mechanisms for the chromospheres to form requires 3D simulations of red giants.

Another noteworthy feature of red giants is that, unlike Sun-like stars whose photospheres have a large number of small convection cells (solar granules), red-giant photospheres, as well as those of red supergiants, have just a few large cells, the features of which cause the variations of brightness so common on both types of stars.

== Evolution ==
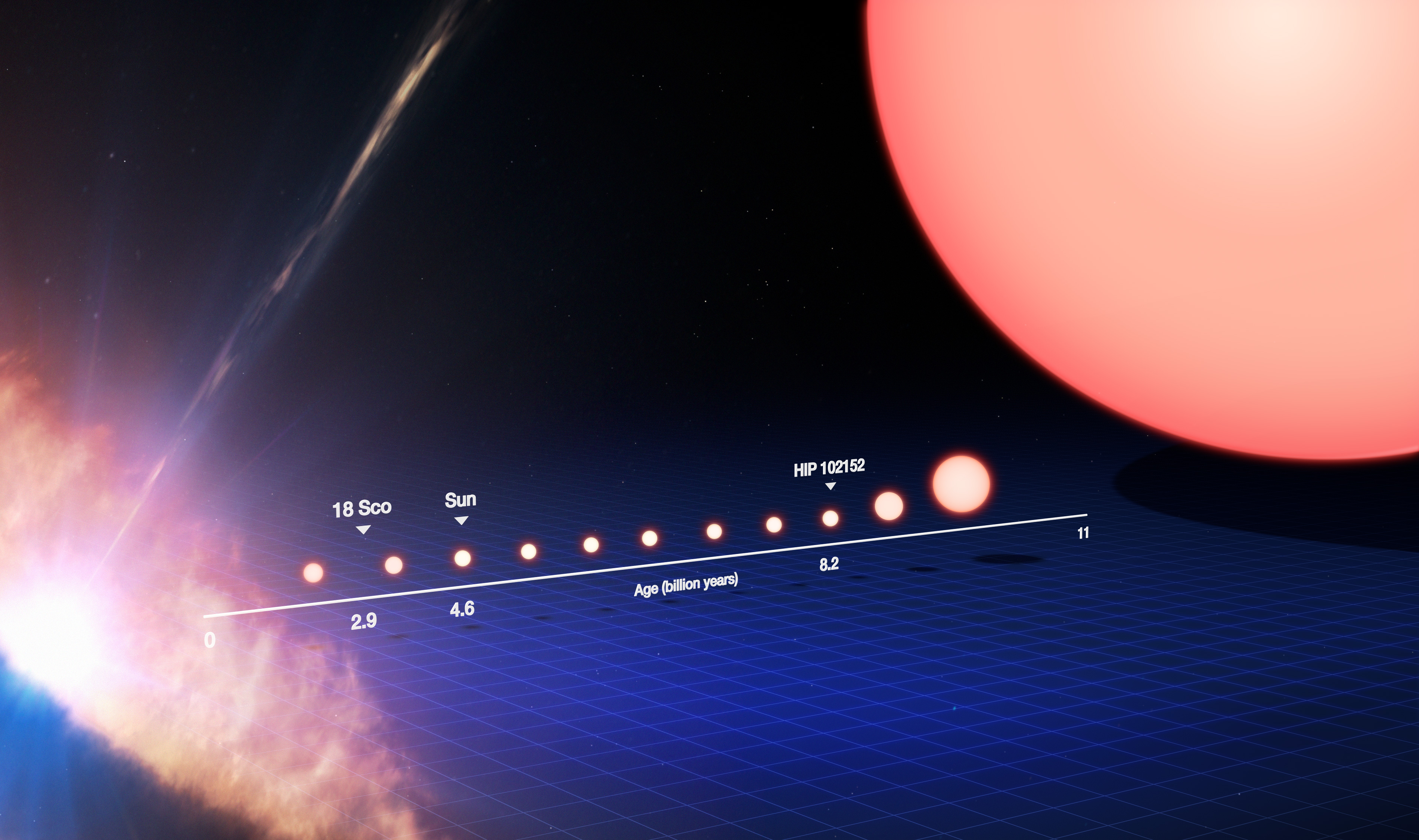
This image tracks the life of a Sun-like star, from its birth on the left side of the frame to its evolution into a red giant on the right after billions of years

Red giants are evolved from main-sequence stars with masses in the range from about 0.3 M_{☉} to around 8 M_{☉}. When a star initially forms from a collapsing molecular cloud in the interstellar medium, it contains primarily hydrogen and helium, with trace amounts of "metals" (in astrophysics, this refers to all elements other than hydrogen and helium). These elements are all uniformly mixed throughout the star. The star "enters" the main sequence when its core reaches a temperature (several million kelvins) high enough to begin fusing hydrogen-1 (the predominant isotope), and establishes hydrostatic equilibrium. (In astrophysics, stellar fusion is often referred to as "burning", with hydrogen fusion sometimes termed "hydrogen burning".) Over its main sequence life, the star slowly fuses the hydrogen in the core into helium; its main-sequence life ends when nearly all the hydrogen in the core has been fused. For the Sun, the main-sequence lifetime is approximately 10 billion years. More massive stars burn their fuel disproportionately faster and so have a shorter lifetime than less massive stars.

When the star has mostly exhausted the hydrogen fuel in its core, the core's rate of nuclear reactions declines, and thus so do the radiation and thermal pressure the core generates, which are what support the star against gravitational contraction. The star further contracts, increasing the pressures and thus temperatures inside the star (as described by the ideal gas law). Eventually a "shell" layer around the core reaches temperatures sufficient to fuse hydrogen and thus generate its own radiation and thermal pressure, which "re-inflates" the star's outer layers and causes them to expand. The hydrogen-burning shell results in a situation that has been described as the mirror principle: when the core within the shell contracts, the layers of the star outside the shell must expand. The detailed physical processes that cause this are complex. Still, the behavior is necessary to satisfy simultaneous conservation of gravitational and thermal energy in a star with the shell structure. The core contracts and heats up due to the lack of fusion, and so the outer layers of the star expand greatly, absorbing most of the extra energy from shell fusion. This process of cooling and expanding is the subgiant stage. When the envelope of the star cools sufficiently it becomes convective, the star stops expanding, its luminosity starts to increase, and the star is ascending the red-giant branch of the Hertzsprung–Russell (H–R) diagram.

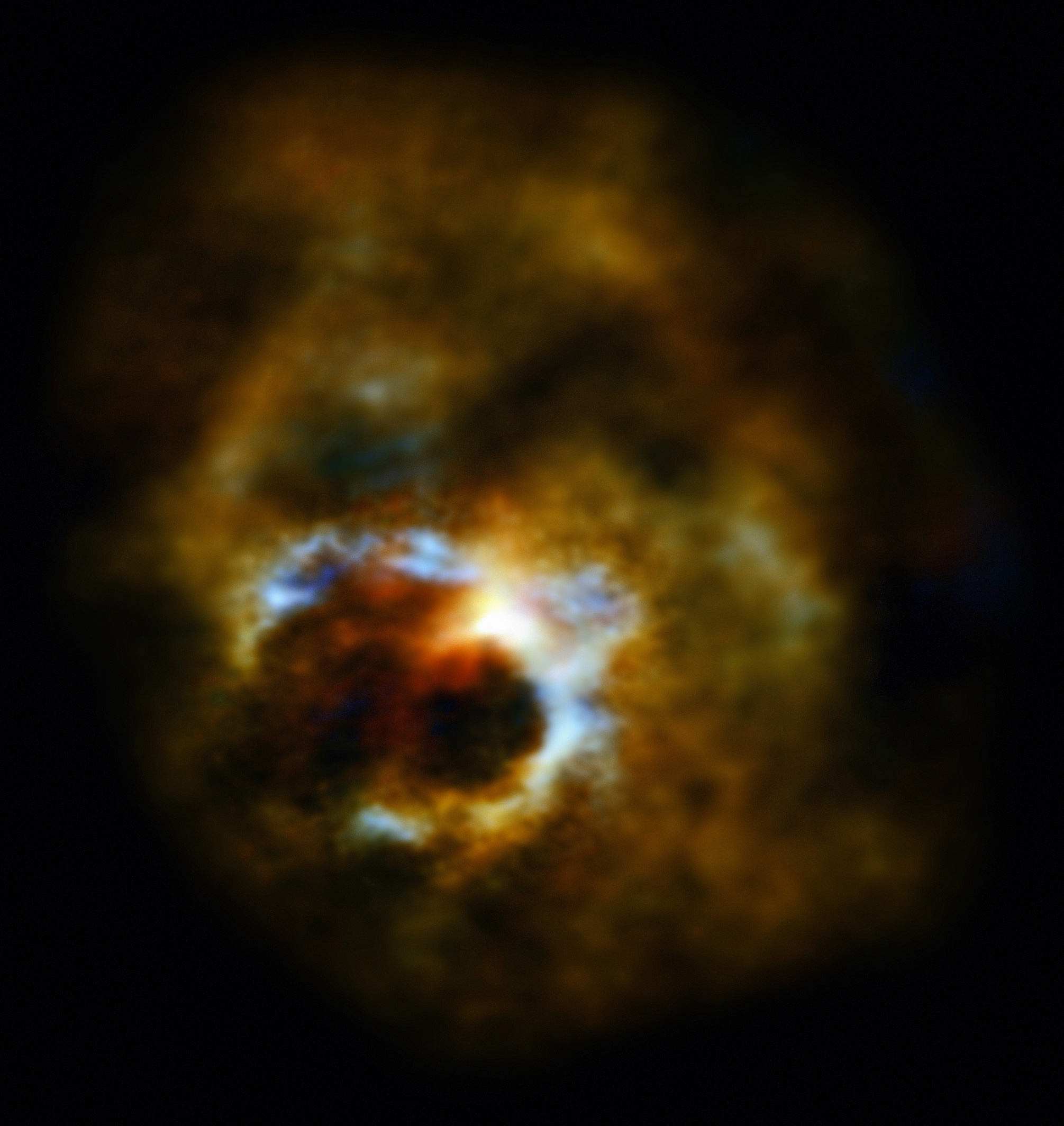
Mira A is an old star, already shedding its outer layers into space

The evolutionary path the star takes as it moves along the red-giant branch depends on the mass of the star. For the Sun and stars of less than about 2 M_{☉} the core will become dense enough that electron degeneracy pressure will prevent it from collapsing further. Once the core is degenerate, it will continue to heat until it reaches a temperature of roughly 1×10^{8} K, hot enough to begin fusing helium to carbon via the triple-alpha process. Once the degenerate core reaches this temperature, the entire core will begin helium fusion nearly simultaneously in a so-called helium flash. In more-massive stars, the collapsing core will reach these temperatures before it is dense enough to be degenerate, so helium fusion will begin much more smoothly, and produce no helium flash. The core helium fusing phase of a star's life is called the horizontal branch in metal-poor stars, so named because these stars lie on a nearly horizontal line in the H–R diagram of many star clusters. Metal-rich helium-fusing stars instead lie on the so-called red clump in the H–R diagram.

An analogous process occurs when the core helium is exhausted, and the star collapses once again, causing helium in a shell to begin fusing. At the same time, hydrogen may begin fusion in a shell just outside the burning helium shell. This puts the star onto the asymptotic giant branch, a second red-giant phase. The helium fusion results in the build-up of a carbon–oxygen core. A star below about 8 M_{☉} will never start fusion in its degenerate carbon–oxygen core. Instead, at the end of the asymptotic-giant-branch phase the star will eject its outer layers, forming a planetary nebula with the core of the star exposed, ultimately becoming a white dwarf. The ejection of the outer mass and the creation of a planetary nebula finally ends the red-giant phase of the star's evolution. The red-giant phase typically lasts only around a billion years in total for a solar mass star, almost all of which is spent on the red-giant branch. The horizontal-branch and asymptotic-giant-branch phases proceed tens of times faster.

If the star has about 0.2 to 0.5 M_{☉}, red dwarfs earlier than about M5V, it is massive enough to become a red giant but does not have enough mass to initiate the fusion of helium. These "intermediate" stars cool somewhat and increase their luminosity but never achieve the tip of the red-giant branch and helium core flash. When the ascent of the red-giant branch ends they puff off their outer layers much like a post-asymptotic-giant-branch star and then become a white dwarf.

=== Stars that do not become red giants ===
Very-low-mass stars are fully convective and may continue to fuse hydrogen into helium for up to a trillion years until only a small fraction of the entire star is hydrogen. Luminosity and temperature steadily increase during this time, just as for more-massive main-sequence stars, but the length of time involved means that the temperature eventually increases by about 50% and the luminosity by around 10 times. Eventually the level of helium increases to the point where the star ceases to be fully convective and the remaining hydrogen locked in the core is consumed in only a few billion more years. Depending on mass, the temperature and luminosity continue to increase for a time during hydrogen shell burning, the star can become hotter than the Sun and tens of times more luminous than when it formed although still not as luminous as the Sun. After some billions more years, they start to become less luminous and cooler even though hydrogen shell burning continues. These become cool helium white dwarfs.

Very-high-mass stars develop into supergiants that follow an evolutionary track that takes them back and forth horizontally over the H–R diagram, at the right end constituting red supergiants. These usually end their life as a type II supernova. The most massive stars can become Wolf–Rayet stars without becoming giants or supergiants at all.

== Planets ==
=== Prospects for habitability ===
Although traditionally it has been suggested the evolution of a star into a red giant will render its planetary system, if present, uninhabitable, some research suggests that, during the evolution of a 1 M_{☉} star along the red-giant branch, it could harbor a habitable zone for several billion years at 2 astronomical units (AU) out to around 100 million years at 9 AU out, giving perhaps enough time for life to develop on a suitable world. After the red-giant stage, there would for such a star be a habitable zone between 7 and 22 AU for an additional one billion years. Later studies have refined this scenario, showing how for a 1 M_{☉} star the habitable zone lasts from 100 million years for a planet with an orbit similar to that of Mars to 210 million years for one that orbits at Saturn's distance to the Sun, the maximum time (370 million years) corresponding for planets orbiting at the distance of Jupiter. However, planets orbiting a 0.5 M_{☉} star in equivalent orbits to those of Jupiter and Saturn would be in the habitable zone for 5.8 billion years and 2.1 billion years, respectively; for stars more massive than the Sun, the times are considerably shorter.

=== Enlargement of planets ===
By 2023, several hundred giant planets had been discovered around giant stars. However, these giant planets are more massive than the giant planets found around solar-type stars. This could be because giant stars are more massive than the Sun (less massive stars will still be on the main sequence and will not have become giants yet) and more massive stars are expected to have more massive planets. However, the masses of the planets that have been found around giant stars do not correlate with the masses of the stars; therefore, the planets could be growing in mass during the stars' red giant phase. The growth in planet mass could be partly due to accretion from stellar wind, although a much larger effect would be Roche lobe overflow causing mass-transfer from the star to the planet when the giant expands out to the orbital distance of the planet. (A similar process in multiple star systems is believed to be the cause of most novas and type Ia supernovas.)

== Examples ==
Many of the well-known bright stars are red giants, because they are luminous and moderately common. The red-giant branch variable star Gacrux is the nearest M-class giant star at 88 light-years. The K1.5 red-giant branch star Arcturus is 36 light-years away.

=== Red-giant branch ===
- Aldebaran (α Tauri)
- Arcturus (α Bootis)
- μ Leonis
- Gacrux (γ Crucis)

=== Red-clump giants ===
- Pollux (β Geminorum)
- Capella Aa (α Aurigae)
- Schedar (α Cassiopeiae)
- δ Andromedae

=== Asymptotic giant branch ===
- ρ Persei
- Mira (ο Ceti)
- χ Cygni
- Rasalgethi (α Herculis)

== The Sun as a red giant ==
The Sun will exit the main sequence in approximately 5 billion years and start to turn into a red giant. As a red giant, the Sun will grow so large (over 200 times its present-day radius: ~256 R_{☉}; ~1.2 AU) that it will engulf Mercury, Venus, and likely Earth. It will lose 46% of its mass growing, then will contract down in size to form a white dwarf.
