= Thermal pressure coefficient =

Measure of the relative pressure change due to a temperature change

In thermodynamics, thermal pressure coefficient is a measure of the relative pressure change of a fluid or a solid in response to a temperature change at constant volume. In an ideal gas, pressure increases linearly with increasing temperature.

The thermal pressure $\gamma_v$ is customarily expressed in its simple form as
$$\gamma_v =\left( \frac{\partial P}{\partial T} \right)_{V}.$$

== Thermodynamic definition ==
Because of the equivalences between many properties and derivatives within thermodynamics (e.g., see Maxwell Relations), there are many formulations of the thermal pressure coefficient, which are equally valid, leading to distinct yet correct interpretations of its meaning. Some formulations for the thermal pressure coefficient include:

$$\left( \frac{\partial P}{\partial T} \right)_{v} = \alpha\kappa_T = \frac{\gamma}{V}C_V = \frac{\alpha}{\beta_T}$$

Where $\alpha$ is the coefficient of thermal expansion, $\kappa_T$ the isothermal bulk modulus, $\gamma$ the Grüneisen parameter, $\beta_T$ the compressibility and $C_V$the constant-volume heat capacity.

Details of the calculation:

$$\left( \frac{\partial P}{\partial T} \right)_{V} = -\left( \frac{\partial V}{\partial T} \right)_{p}\left( \frac{\partial P}{\partial V} \right)_{T} = - (V\alpha) \left(\frac{-1}{\kappa_T}\right) = \alpha\kappa_T$$

$$\left( \frac{\partial P}{\partial T} \right)_{V} = \frac{\frac{1}{V}\left( \frac{\partial V}{\partial T} \right)_{p}}{\frac{-1}{V} \left( \frac{\partial V}{\partial P} \right)_{T}} = \frac{\alpha}{\beta}$$

== Uses ==
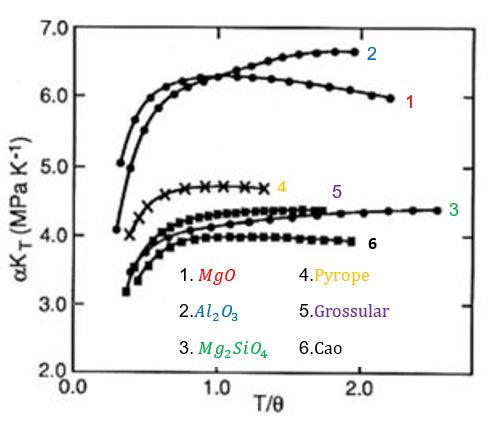
Figure 1: Thermal pressure as a function of temperature normalized to A of the few compounds commonly used in the study of Geophysics.

The thermal pressure coefficient can be considered as a fundamental property of materials; it is closely related to properties such as internal pressure, sonic velocity, the entropy of melting, isothermal compressibility, isobaric thermal expansivity, and phase transitions. Thus, the study of the thermal pressure coefficient provides a useful basis for understanding the nature of liquid and solid. Since it is normally difficult to obtain the properties by thermodynamic and statistical mechanics methods due to complex interactions among molecules, experimental methods attract much attention. The thermal pressure coefficient is used to calculate results that are applied widely in industry. Commonly the thermal pressure coefficient may be expressed as functions of temperature and volume. In classical physics, two main types of calculation of the thermal pressure coefficient were employed: one based on the virial theorem; the other based on the van der Waals equation.

== Thermal pressure at high temperature ==
As mentioned above, $\alpha\kappa_T$ is one of the most common formulations for the thermal pressure coefficient. Both $\alpha$ and $\kappa_T$ are affected by temperature changes, but the value of $\alpha$ and $\kappa_T$ of a solid much less sensitive to temperature change above its Debye temperature. Thus, the thermal pressure of a solid due to moderate temperature change above the Debye temperature can be approximated by assuming a constant value of $\alpha$ and $\kappa_T$.

On the contrary, in the paper, authors demonstrated that, at ambient pressure, the pressure predicted of Au and MgO from a constant value of $\alpha\kappa_T$ deviates from the experimental data, and the higher temperature, the more deviation. In addition, the authors suggested a thermal expansion model to replace the thermal pressure model.

== Thermal pressure in a crystal ==
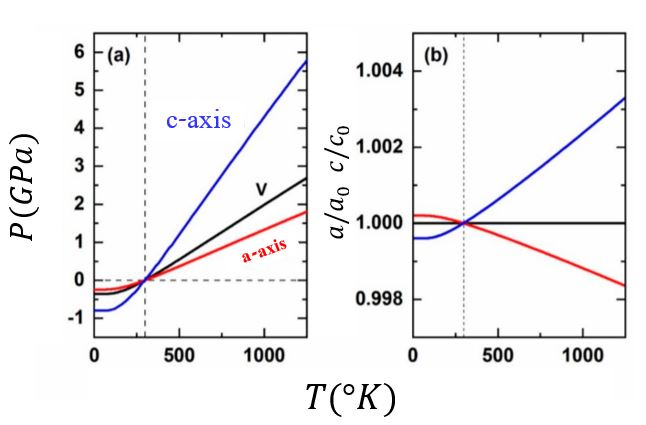
Figure 2 (a): The lines of constant (a=b) and c cell parameters of a zircon crystal (ZrSiO4 ) passing through room T and P do not coincide with the isochore (marked in black). Figure 2 (b): As a result of the anisotropic thermal pressure (as seen in (a)) there are significant changes in the a and c cell parameters along this isochore.

The thermal pressure of a crystal defines how the unit-cell parameters change as a function of pressure and temperature. Therefore, it also controls how the cell parameters change along an isochore, namely as a function of $\left( \frac{\partial P}{\partial T} \right)_{V}$. Usually, Mie-Grüneisen-Debye and other Quasi harmonic approximation (QHA) based state functions are being used to estimate volumes and densities of mineral phases in diverse applications such as thermodynamic, deep-Earth geophysical models and other planetary bodies. In the case of isotropic (or approximately isotropic) thermal pressure, the unit cell parameter remains constant along the isochore and the QHA is valid. But when the thermal pressure is anisotropic, the unit cell parameter changes so, the frequencies of vibrational modes also change even in constant volume and the QHA is no longer valid.

The combined effect of a change in pressure and temperature is described by the strain tensor $\varepsilon_{ij}$:
$$\varepsilon_{ij}= \alpha_{ij} dT- \beta_{ij} dP$$

Where $\alpha_{ij}$ is the volume thermal expansion tensor and $\beta_{ij}$ is the compressibility tensor. The line in the P-T space which indicates that the strain $\epsilon_{ij}$ is constant in a particular direction within the crystal is defined as:
$$\left( \frac{\partial P}{\partial T} \right)_{V}=\frac{\alpha_{ij}}{\beta_{ij}}$$

Which is an equivalent definition of the isotropic degree of thermal pressure.

== See also ==
- Isochoric process
- Pressure
- Hydrostatic equilibrium
