= Bloch–Grüneisen law =

Behaviour of metals at low temperatures

In solid-state physics, the Bloch–Grüneisen law or the Bloch's T^{5} law describes the temperature dependence of electrical resistivity in metals due to the scattering of conduction electrons by lattice vibrations (phonons) below Debye temperature. The theory was initially put forward by Felix Bloch in 1930 and expanded by Eduard Grüneisen in 1933.

The Bloch–Grüneisen temperature has been observed experimentally in a two-dimensional electron gas and in graphene.

== Description ==
For typical three-dimensional metals, the temperature-dependence of the electrical resistivity ρ(T) due to the scattering of electrons by acoustic phonons changes from a high-temperature regime in which ρ∝T to a low-temperature regime in which ρ∝T^{5} at a characteristic temperature known as the Debye temperature. For low density electron systems, however, the Fermi surface can be substantially smaller than the size of the Brillouin zone, and only a small fraction of acoustic phonons can scatter off electrons. This results in a new characteristic temperature known as the Bloch–Grüneisen temperature that is lower than the Debye temperature. The Bloch–Grüneisen temperature is defined as $2\hbar v_{\mathrm s}k_{\mathrm F}/k_{\mathrm B}$, where ħ is the Planck constant, v_{s} is the velocity of sound, ħk_{F} is the Fermi momentum, and k_{B} is the Boltzmann constant.

When the temperature is lower than the Bloch–Grüneisen temperature, the most energetic thermal phonons have a typical momentum of $k_{\mathrm B}T/v_{\mathrm s}$ which is smaller than ħk_{F}, the momentum of the conducting electrons at the Fermi surface. This means that the electrons will only scatter in small angles when they absorb or emit a phonon. In contrast when the temperature is higher than the Bloch–Grüneisen temperature, there are thermal phonons of all momenta and in this case electrons will also experience large angle scattering events when they absorb or emit a phonon. In many cases, the Bloch–Grüneisen temperature is approximately equal to the Debye temperature (usually written $\Theta_{\rm D}$), which is used in modeling specific heat capacity. However, in particular circumstances these temperatures can be quite different.

== Formula ==
Mathematically, the model produces a resistivity given by Bloch–Grüneisen formula:

$$\rho(T)=A\left(\frac{T}{\Theta_{\rm R}}\right)^n \int_0^{\Theta_R/T}\frac{t^n}{(e^t-1)(1-e^{-t})}dt\,.$$
Here, $\Theta_{\rm R}$ is a characteristic temperature (typically matching well with the Debye temperature). Under Bloch's original assumptions for simple metals, $n=5$. For $\Theta_{\rm R} \gg T$, this can be approximated as $\rho \propto T^5$ dependence. In contrast, the so called Bloch–Wilson limit, where $n=3$ works better for s-d inter-band scattering, such as with transition metals. The second limit gives $\rho \propto T^3$ at low temperatures. In practice, which model is more applicable depends on the particular material.

== See also ==
- Bloch T^{3/2} law
