= Alexander Gottlieb Baumgarten =

German philosopher

- Born: 17 July 1714; Berlin, Margraviate of Brandenburg
- Died: 27 May 1762 (aged 47); Frankfurt an der Oder, Margraviate of Brandenburg

Education
- Education: University of Halle (PhD, 1735); University of Jena (no degree)
- Academic advisor: Johann Peter Reusch

Philosophical work
- Era: 18th-century philosophy
- Region: Western philosophy
- School: Age of Enlightenment; Rationalism
- Institutions: University of Halle; University of Frankfurt (Oder)
- Notable students: Christian Garve; Georg Friedrich Meier
- Main interests: Metaphysics, ethics, aesthetics
- Notable ideas: Aesthetics as the perfection of sensuous cognition

Alexander Gottlieb Baumgarten (/ˈbaʊmɡɑːrtən/; German: [ˈbaʊmˌgaʁtn̩]; 17 July 1714 – 27 May 1762) was a German philosopher. He established aesthetics as a philosophical discipline.

He was the brother of the theologian Siegmund Jakob Baumgarten (1706–1757).

== Biography ==
Baumgarten was born in Berlin on 17 July 1714. He was the fifth of seven sons of the Pietist pastor of the garrison, Jacob Baumgarten, and his wife Rosina Elisabeth Baumgarten (nee Wiedemann). His father had also worked as an assistant to the pastor and theologian August Hermann Francke. His mother died in 1717 and his father died in 1722. He was educated first at the Berlinisches Gymnasium zum Grauen Kloster. There he studied Hebrew and Latin poetry with Martin Georg Christgau from 1722 to 1727. In 1727 he moved to Halle an der Saale to study at Francke's school for orphans, the Waisenhaus.

In 1730 Baumgarten entered the University of Halle (UH) where he was student of philosophy and theology. There he was a pupil of Johann Joachim Lange, a vocal opponent of philosopher Christian Wolff, and Gotthilf August Francke, the son of August Hermann Francke. In 1733, during his formal studies at the UH, he concurrently attended lectures on the philosophy of Wolff by Johann Peter Reusch at the University of Jena. Reusch had himself studied under Wolff. In 1735 he earned a master’s degree from the UH after completing his first major work, the thesis Meditationes philosophicae de nonnullis ad poema pertinentibus. This thesis founded a new philosophical discipline of aesthetics as the "science of sensible knowledge".

In 1737 Baumgarten was made a professor of theology and philosophy at the University of Frankfurt, Oder. While Baumgarten himself made little application of his concept of aesthetics to the fields of music and art, his pupil and biographer, Georg F. Meier, did make these connections; establishing an aesthetics of music in his Betrachtungen über den ersten Grundsatz aller schönen Künste und Wissenschaften (1757) which in turn influenced philosophers Moses Mendelssohn and Johann Georg Sulzer.

== Philosophy ==
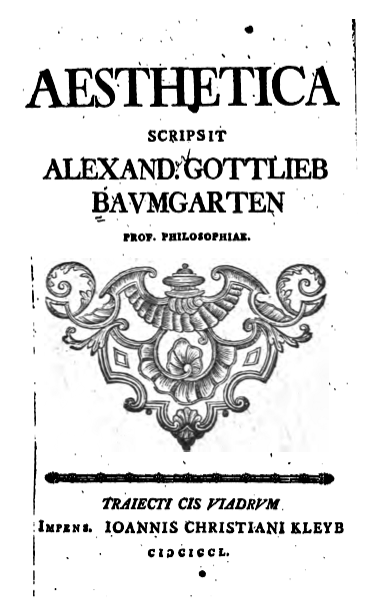
Aesthetica (1750) by Alexander Gottlieb Baumgarten

Baumgarten appropriated the word aesthetics, which had always meant "sensation", to mean taste or "sense" of beauty. In so doing, he gave the word a different significance, thereby inventing its modern philosophical usage. The word had been used differently since the time of the ancient Greeks to mean the ability to receive stimulation from one or more of the five bodily senses. In his Metaphysica (1739), § 607, Baumgarten defined taste, in its wider meaning, as the ability to judge according to the senses, instead of according to the intellect. Such a judgment of taste he saw as based on feelings of pleasure or displeasure. A science of aesthetics would be, for Baumgarten, a deduction of the rules or principles of artistic or natural beauty from individual "taste".

Previously, the word aesthetics had merely meant "sensibility" or "responsiveness to stimulation of the senses" in its use by ancient writers but with the development of art as a commercial enterprise linked to the rise of a nouveau riche class across Europe, the purchasing of art inevitably led to the question, "what is good art?". Baumgarten developed aesthetics to mean the study of good and bad "taste", thus good and bad art, linking good taste with beauty. By trying to develop an idea of good and bad taste, he also in turn generated philosophical debate around this new meaning of aesthetics. Without it, there would be no basis for aesthetic debate as there would be no objective criterion, basis for comparison, or reason from which one could develop an objective argument.

== Reception ==
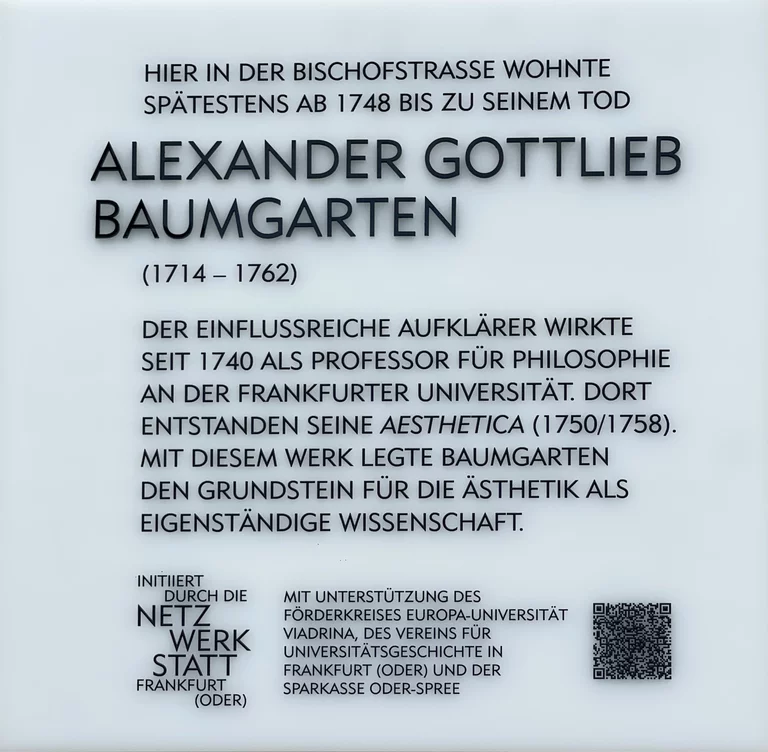
Memorial plaque for Baumgarten in Frankfurt an der Oder, his last place of residence and work

Kant

In 1781, Immanuel Kant declared that Baumgarten's aesthetics could never contain objective rules, laws, or principles of natural or artistic beauty.

The Germans are the only people who presently (1781) have come to use the word aesthetic[s] to designate what others call the critique of taste. They are doing so on the basis of a false hope conceived by that superb analyst Baumgarten. He hoped to bring our critical judging of the beautiful under rational principles, and to raise the rules for such judging to the level of a lawful science. Yet that endeavor is futile. For, as far as their principal sources are concerned, those supposed rules or criteria are merely empirical. Hence they can never serve as determinate a priori laws to which our judgment of taste must conform. It is, rather, our judgment of taste which constitutes the proper test for the correctness of those rules or criteria. Because of this it is advisable to follow either of two alternatives. One of these is to stop using this new name aesthetic[s] in this sense of critique of taste, and to reserve the name aesthetic[s] for the doctrine of sensibility that is true science. (In doing so we would also come closer to the language of the ancients and its meaning. Among the ancients the division of cognition into aisthētá kai noētá [sensed or thought] was quite famous.) The other alternative would be for the new aesthetic[s] to share the name with speculative philosophy. We would then take the name partly in its transcendental meaning, and partly in the psychological meaning. (Critique of Pure Reason, A 21, note.)

Nine years later, in his Critique of Judgment, Kant conformed to Baumgarten's new usage and employed the word aesthetic to mean the judgment of taste or the estimation of the beautiful. For Kant, an aesthetic judgment is subjective in that it relates to the internal feeling of pleasure or displeasure and not to any qualities in an external object.

For many years, Kant used Baumgarten's Metaphysica (1739) as a handbook or manual for his lectures on that topic. (Note: Baumgarten's student Georg Friedrich Meier translated the Metaphysics from Latin to German, an endeavour which – according to Meier – Baumgarten himself had planned, but could not find the time to execute (see "Georg Friedrich Meier’s Preface to the First German Translation" of Baumgarten's Metaphysics.))

Tolstoy

In 1897, Leo Tolstoy, in his What is Art?, criticized Baumgarten's book on aesthetics. Tolstoy opposed "Baumgarten's trinity – Good, Truth and Beauty…." Tolstoy asserted that "these words not only have no definite meaning, but they hinder us from giving any definite meaning to existing art…." Baumgarten, he said, claimed that there are three ways to know perfection: "Beauty is the perfect (the absolute) perceived by the senses. Truth is the perfect perceived by reason. The good is the perfect attained by the moral will." Tolstoy, however, contradicted Baumgarten's theory and claimed that good, truth, and beauty have nothing in common and may even oppose each other.

…the arbitrary uniting of these three concepts served as a basis for the astonishing theory according to which the difference between good art, conveying good feelings, and bad art, conveying wicked feelings, was totally obliterated, and one of the lowest manifestations of art, art for mere pleasure…came to be regarded as the highest art. And art became, not the important thing it was intended to be, but the empty amusement of idle people. (What is Art?, VII.)

Whatever the limitations of Baumgarten's theory of aesthetics, Frederick Copleston credits him with playing a formative role in German aesthetics, extending Christian Wolff's philosophy to topics that Wolff did not consider, and demonstrating the existence of a legitimate topic for philosophical analysis that could not be reduced to abstract logical analysis.

Heidegger

Baumgarten receives a thorough and sustained treatment as one of the thinkers to Kant in the seminar of Martin Heidegger in the summer semester of 1933, and in the winter semester of 1933–34.

== Works ==
- Dissertatio chorographica, Notiones superi et inferi, indeque adscensus et descensus, in chorographiis sacris occurentes, evolvens (1735)
- Meditationes philosophicae de nonnullis ad poema pertinentibus ("Philosophical meditations pertaining to some matters concerning poetry", doctoral thesis, 1735)
- De ordine in audiendis philosophicis per triennium academicum quaedam praefatus acroases proximae aestati destinatas indicit Alexander Gottlieb Baumgarten (1738)
- Metaphysica (1739)
- Ethica philosophica (1740)
- Alexander Gottlieb Baumgarten eröffnet Einige Gedancken vom vernünfftigen Beyfall auf Academien, und ladet zu seiner Antritts-Rede [...] ein (1740)
- Serenissimo potentissimo principi Friderico, Regi Borussorum marchioni brandenburgico S. R. J. archicamerario et electori, caetera, clementissimo dominio felicia regni felicis auspicia, a d. III. Non. Quinct. 1740 (1740)
- Philosophische Briefe von Aletheophilus (1741)
- Scriptis, quae moderator conflictus academici disputavit, praefatus rationes acroasium suarum Viadrinarum reddit Alexander Gottlieb Baumgarten (1743)
- Aesthetica (1750)
- Initia Philosophiae Practicae. Primae Acroamatice (1760)
- Acroasis logica in Christianum L.B. de Wolff (1761, 2nd ed. 1773)
- Ius naturae (posthum 1763)
- Sciagraphia encyclopaedia philosophicae (ed. Johs. Christian Foerster 1769)
- Philosophia generalis (ed. Johs. Christian Foerster 1770)
- Alex. Gottl. Baumgartenii Praelectiones theologiae dogmaticae (ed. Salomon Semmler; 1773)
- Alexander Gottlieb Baumgartens Metaphysik (translated by Georg Friedrich Meier 1766)
- Gedanken über die Reden Jesu nach dem Inhalt der evangelischen Geschichten (ed. F.G. Scheltz & A.B. Thiele; 1796–1797)

English translations

- Alexander Baumgarten, Reflections on Poetry: Alexander Gottlieb Baumgarten's Meditationes philosophicae de nonnullis ad poema pertinentibus translated by Karl Aschenbrenner and William B. Holther, Berkeley and Los Angeles: University of California Press, 1954.
- Alexander Baumgarten, Metaphysics. A Critical Translation with Kant's Elucidations, Selected Notes, and Related Materials translated and edited by Courtney D. Fugate and John Hymers, London, New York: Bloomsbury Publishing, 2013.
- Alexander Baumgarten, Immanuel Kant, Baumgarten's Elements of First Practical Philosophy: A Critical Translation with Kant's Reflections on Moral Philosophy translated and edited by Courtney D. Fugate and John Hymers, London, New York: Bloomsbury Academic, 2020.
- Alexander Baumgarten, Baumgarten's Philosophical Ethics: A Critical Translation translated, edited, and annotated by John Hymers, London, New York: Bloomsbury Academic, 2024.
