= Georg Händel =

German barber-surgeon

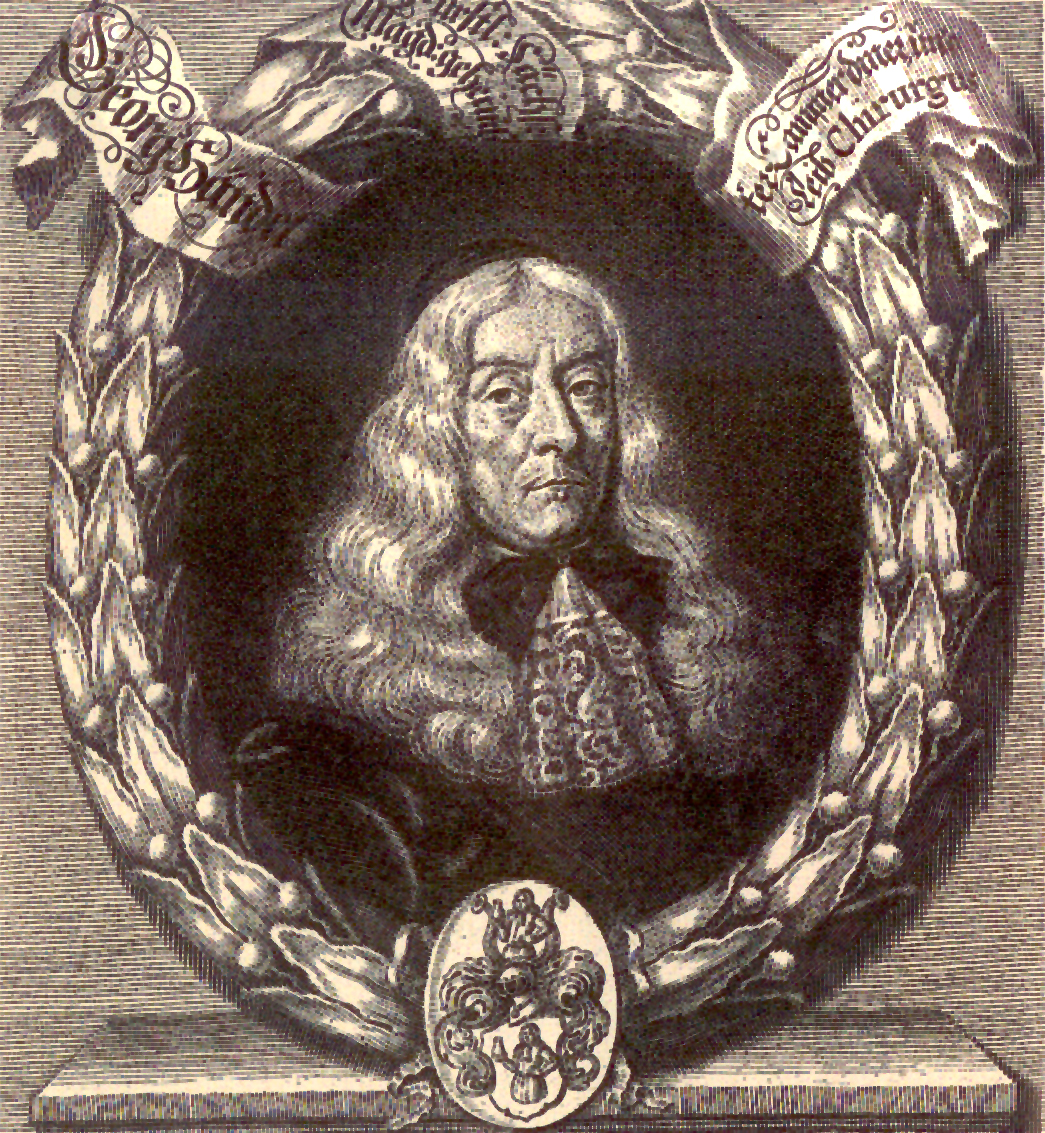
Georg Händel (1622–1697)

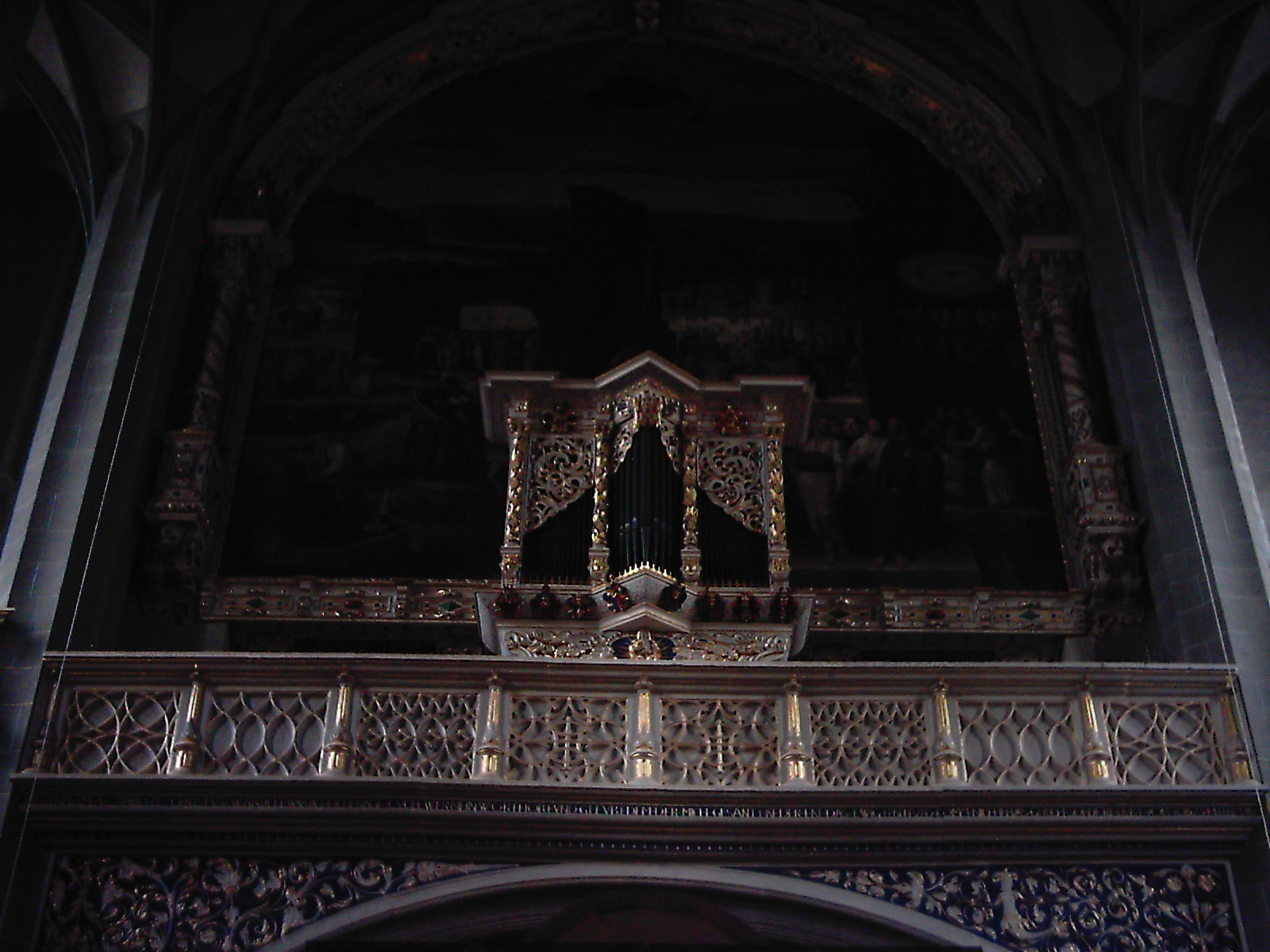
The small organ in the Marktkirche Unser Lieben Frauen

Johann Adolf I, Duke of Saxe-Weissenfels

Georg Händel (German: [ˈhɛndl̩]; Halle, Archbishopric of Magdeburg, 24 September 1622 – Halle, Duchy of Magdeburg, 11 February 1697) was a barber-surgeon and the father of Georg Frideric Handel.

== Parents and early life ==
Händel's father, Valentin Händel (1582–1636), was a coppersmith from Breslau (present day Wrocław). In 1607 he married Anna Beichling (1586–1670), the daughter of a master coppersmith in Eisleben, Samuel Beichling (1552–1609). Both were Protestants (Eisleben was Martin Luther's home town), as was Breslau, even though Silesia was a Habsburg possession. The couple decided to emigrate in 1608 to Halle, in reliably Lutheran Saxony. Georg was the sixth child of Valentin and Anna, born in 1622 in the Neumarkt section of Halle. He had four brothers and one sister: Valentin Händel (1609–1633), Christoph Händel (1612–1678), Barbara Händel (b. 1613), Samuel Händel (b. 1617) and Gottfried Händel (1619–1619).

Valentin became a respected citizen of the city. The 1697 inscription on the vault Georg Händel purchased in 1674 refers to his father as "Councillor," presumably a member of the city council of Halle. Georg's two elder brothers, Valentin and Christoph, learned their father's trade. The Thirty Years' War, however, was extremely destructive to Halle, and Georg's father died of the plague when Georg was 14. The prospect of education beyond Halle's Lutheran Gymnasium was impossible.

== Händel's apprenticeship as a barber-surgeon ==
After his father's death in 1636, Georg took up studies with the town surgeon-barber, Andreas Beger, who in 1618 had married the daughter of the English musician, William Brade, the court Kapellmeister at Halle. In 1643, before he reached the age of 21, he married Anna née Katte, the recent widow of another barber, Christoph Oettinger,; Anna was 12 years his senior. Due to this marriage, Georg was entitled to the freedom of the town. In 1645 Georg Handel was appointed town surgeon (Amts-chirurgus) of Giebichenstein, a suburb of some importance in Halle. In 1660 Augustus, Duke of Saxe-Weissenfels conferred on him the titles of Kammerdiener (court valet) and Leibchirurgus (surgeon). On the Duke's death, these titles were confirmed by the Elector of Brandenburg, who also added the prefix Kurbrandenburgische thereby making the appointments applicable to Brandenburg as well.

== Family ==
Georg had six children with his first wife: Dorothea Elisabeth (1644–1690) – wife of Michael Beyer (1628–1668) and Zacharias Kleinhempel (1648–1698), Gottfried (1645–1682), Christoph (1648–1648), Anna Barbara (1646–1680), Karl (1649–1713), and Sophia Rosina (1652–1728). The couple lived in a village called Neumarkt, south of Saalkreis. In 1666 he bought a tavern, The Yellow Deer. In 1672 he was granted a licence to serve wine, and he also owned a vineyard outside the city walls. His wife died in 1682; the next year he married Dorothea Taust (1651–1730), the daughter of a Lutheran pastor in Giebichenstein, Georg Taust (1606–1685). In 1685 George Friedrich Handel was born, followed by his sisters Dorothea Sophia (1687–1718), who in 1708 married lawyer and war councilor Michael Dietrich Michaelsen (1680–1748), and Johanna Christiana (1690–1709). Among his descendants was Johanna Friederike Michaelsen (1711–1771), who was married to lawyer Johann Ernst von Flörcke (1695–1762), and Dorothea Luisa Flörcke (1737–1811), who was married to Halle councilor Friedrich August Reichhelm (1727–1782).

According to John Mainwaring, Handel's first biographer, "Handel had discovered such a strong propensity to Music, that his father who always intended him for the study of the Civil Law, had reason to be alarmed. He strictly forbade him to meddle with any musical instrument but Handel found means to get a little clavichord privately convey'd to a room at the top of the house. To this room he constantly stole when the family was asleep". One day Handel and his father went on a trip to Weissenfels to visit either his son (Handel's half-brother) Karl, or grandson (Handel's nephew) Georg Christian who was serving as valet to Duke Johann Adolf I. According to legend, the young Handel attracted the attention of the Duke with his playing on the church organ. At his urging, Handel's father permitted him to take lessons in musical composition and keyboard technique from Friedrich Wilhelm Zachow, the organist at the Lutheran Marienkirche.

== Sources ==
- Adams, Aileen K.; Hofestädt, B. (August 2005). "Georg Händel (1622-97): The Barber-Surgeon Father of George Frideric Handel (1685-1759)". Journal of Medical Biography. 13 (3): 142–49. doi:10.1258/j.jmb.2005.04-49. PMID 16059526.
- Bach, J. S. (1 August 1905). "The Fathers of Great Musicians". The Musical Times. 46 (750): 522–25. doi:10.2307/904292. JSTOR 904292.
- Deutsch, Otto Erich (1955). Handel: A Documentary Biography. London: Adam and Charles Black.
- Maitland, J.A. Fuller; Squire, W. Barclay (1890). "Handel, George Friederick". In Stephen, Leslie; Lee, Sidney (eds.). Dictionary of National Biography. Vol. XXIV Haile–Harriott. New York: Macmillan and Co. pp. 277–91.
