= Eduard Grüneisen =

German physicist (1877–1949)

- Grüneisen at Solvay Conference in 1913
- Born: 26 May 1877; Giebichenstein, German Empire
- Died: 5 April 1949 (aged 71); Marburg, Germany
- Education: Universität Halle; Technische Hochschule Charlottenburg; University of Berlin
- Known for: Grüneisen parameter Bloch–Grüneisen law Mie–Grüneisen equation of state
- Spouse: Lotte Bruns (m. 1910)
- Scientific career
- Workplaces: Physikalisch-Technische Bundesanstalt (1899–1927); University of Marburg (1927–1947)
- Thesis: Ueber die bestimmung des wärmeleitvermögens der metalle und über das verhältnis desselben zur elektrischen leitfähigkeit bei kupfer, eisen und einer nickelkupferlegierung (1900)
- Doctoral advisor: Max Planck, Emil Warburg
- Notable students: Henry H. Barschall

Eduard August Grüneisen (26 May 1877 – 5 April 1949) was a German physicist. He is best known for the Grüneisen parameter, the Mie–Grüneisen equation of state and the Bloch–Grüneisen law. He served as director of the Physics Department at the University of Marburg for 20 years, and was editor of Annalen der Physik together with Max Planck.

== Early life and education ==
Eduard August Grüneisen was born on 26 May 1877 in Giebichenstein near Halle (Saale), as the fifth son of Eduard Grüneisen (1841–1916), a pastor, and Elisabeth Grüneisen (née Dryander) (1846–1931). After graduating from a humanistic gymnasium in the spring of 1895, he at age 17 was drawn to pursuing natural sciences, which was the only area not represented among his brothers.

Grüneisen studied a few semesters in Universität Halle (1895) and Technische Hochschule Charlottenburg (1895–1896), after which he moved to he moved to University of Berlin, where he eventually completed a doctorate in 1900 as a student of Max Planck and Emil Warburg. His Ph.D. thesis is titled (in German) Ueber die bestimmung des wärmeleitvermögens der metalle und über das verhältnis desselben zur elektrischen leitfähigkeit bei kupfer, eisen und einer nickelkupferlegierung. In English, this translates to On the Determination of the Thermal Conductivity of Metals and its Relation to the Electrical Conductivity of Copper, Iron and a Nickel–Copper Alloy.

== Scientific career ==
Grüneisen was employed at Physikalisch-Technische Bundesanstalt from 1899–1927, first as an assistant in the laboratory of Friedrich Kohlrausch, who had offered him this position, then from 1904 he became a permanent member of staff, then from 1911 as a professor and member. He also became head of the Weak Current Laboratory.

In February 1927, after turning down several other appointments, Grüneisen was appointed full professor of experimental physics at the University of Marburg and director of its Physics Department. Since 1929 he was together with Max Planck editor of Annalen der Physik. He retired from University of Marburg in 1947.

The Grüneisen parameter is named after him. Grüneisen is also the co-eponym of Mie–Grüneisen equation of state and the Bloch–Grüneisen law.

== During World Wars and Third Reich ==
Grüneisen completed his military service from October 1901 to October 1902. When World War I broke out in 1914, he had to interrupt his work and was drafted as a lieutenant in Greece and Bulgaria where he worked in artillery and radio. He received various decorations, including the Iron Cross 2nd Class.

In 1933 Grüneisen signed the Vow of allegiance of the Professors of the German Universities and High-Schools to Adolf Hitler and the National Socialistic State. However his denazification form from December 1946 shows that Grüneisen was neither a party member nor an organizational member of the Nazi party. During the Third Reich, Grüneisen refused to begin his lectures with the Hitler salute, and he sometimes expelled Nazi-leaning students from the laboratory. He received two reprimands for this behavior. In at least one case, he took on non-Aryan students. Notably, he took on Henry H. Barschall as a doctoral student for as long as he could and ultimately helped him emigrate to the USA.

== Personal life ==
Grüneisen married Lotte Bruns in 1910. They had three sons and two daughters, however all of their sons died. Henry H. Barschall recounts meeting Grüneisen's daughter at an award ceremony in Marburg.

Grüneisen died in Marburg on 5 April 1949.

== See also ==
- Solvay Conference
