= Georg Friedrich Meier =

German philosopher (1718–1777)

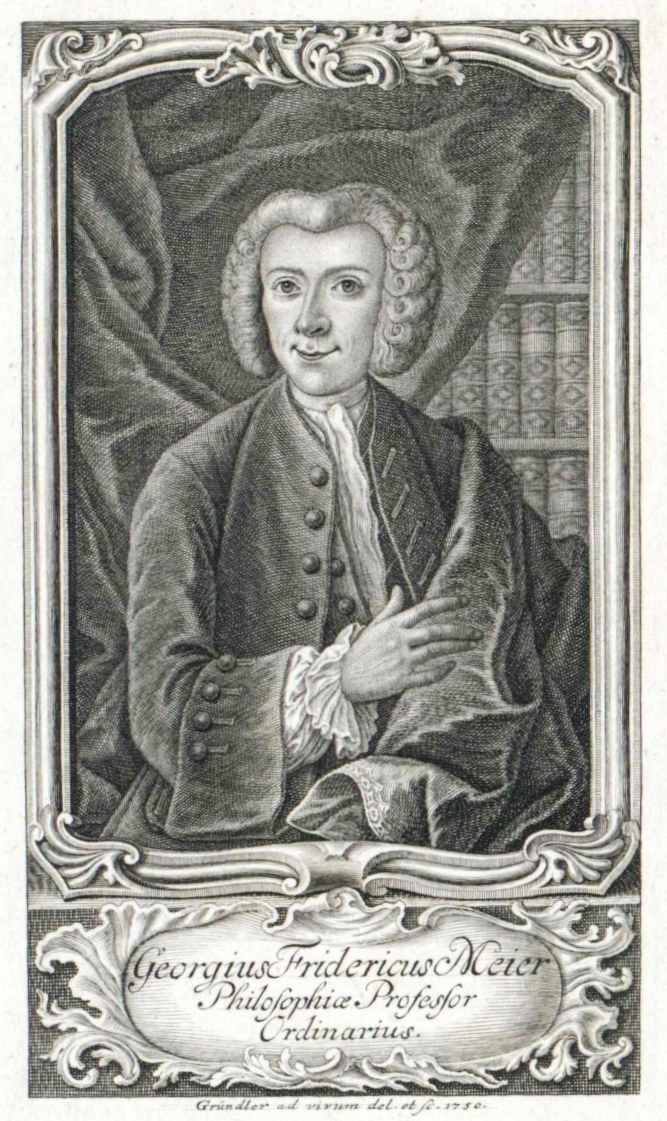
- Born: 26 March 1718; Ammendorf, Duchy of Magdeburg, Kingdom of Prussia
- Died: 21 June 1777 (aged 59); Giebichenstein, Duchy of Magdeburg, Kingdom of Prussia

Education
- Education: University of Halle
- Academic advisor: A. G. Baumgarten

Philosophical work
- Era: 18th-century philosophy
- Region: Western philosophy
- School: Age of Enlightenment
- Institutions: University of Halle
- Main interests: Aesthetics
- Notable ideas: Criticism of mechanism

Georg Friedrich Meier (26 March 1718 – 21 June 1777) was a German philosopher and aesthetician. A follower of Alexander Gottlieb Baumgarten, he reformed the philosophy of Christian Wolff by introducing elements of John Locke's empiricist theory of knowledge.

== Career ==
Meier studied philosophy and theology at the University of Halle, where he was a pupil of Baumgarten. Meier succeeded Baumgarten as extraordinary professor, and became a full professor at Halle in 1748.

== Animal rights ==
Meier was an early advocate of animal rights. In 1749, Meier authored Versuch eines neuen Lehrgebäudes von den Seelen der Thiere (Attempt of a new teaching structure from the souls of animals) which ascribed the same sensory perceptions to both animals and man. He granted animals imagination, intelligence, judgement, memory, language, pleasure and displeasure. Meier believed that animals were capable of love and that their souls were eternal for God cannot destroy anything.

Meier fiercely opposed the mechanist views of René Descartes. He believed that God had endowed animals with souls to enjoy his creation and after death an animals soul could reach the next step of incarnation until finally becoming a human soul. His doctrine of metempsychosis was not based on respect for animal life or their welfare. In contrast, Meier advocated the killing of animals due to his unusual belief that it would accelerate the rise of their souls.

== Works ==
- Gedancken von Schertzen, Halle 1744.
- Anfangsgründe aller schönen Künste und Wissenschaften, Halle 1748–50 (3 vols.).
- Versuch eines neuen Lehrgebäudes von den Seelen der Thiere, Halle 1749.
- Vernunftlehre, Halle 1752.
- Auszug aus der Vernunftlehre, Halle 1752 (reprinted in Kant's gesammelte Schriften Akademie Ausgabe, XVI, pp. 1–872 with the annotations by Kant).
- Metaphysik, Halle: vol. 1 (1755), vol. 2 (1756), vol. 3 (1757), vol. 4 (1759).
- Versuch einer allgemeinen Auslegungskunst, Halle 1757.
- Philosophische Sittenlehre Halle 1753-1761 (5 vols.).
- Alexander Gottlieb Baumgarten Leben, Halle 1763.
- Beyträge zu der Lehre von den Vorurtheilen, Halle 1766.
- Betrachtungen über die Schranken der menschlichen Erkenntniss, Halle 1775.

English translations

- Georg Friedrich Meier, Excerpt from the Doctrine of Reason translated by Aaron Bunch in collaboration with Axel Gelfert and Riccardo Pozzo, London, New York: Bloomsbury Publishing, 2016.
