= Giebichenstein =

District in Halle (Saale), Germany

- Stadtteil of Halle
- Interactive map of Giebichenstein
- Location within Germany Location within Saxony-Anhalt
- Coordinates: 51°30′9″N 11°57′16″E
- Country: Germany
- State: Saxony-Anhalt
- City: Halle
- Time zone: UTC+01:00 (CET)
  - Summer (DST): UTC+02:00 (CEST)

Giebichenstein is a district (Stadtteil) in the north of Halle (Saale) on the eastern bank of the river Saale in the Saxony-Anhalt state of Germany. It is part of the Stadtbezirk Nord.

== People ==
- German physicist Eduard Grüneisen was born in Giebichenstein.
- Georg Händel, father of famous composer George Frideric Handel, was town surgeon of Giebichenstein.
- Georg Friedrich Meier, a German philosopher and aesthetician, died in Giebichenstein.
- Hans Caspar von Krockow was the Amtshauptmann of Giebichenstein.

== Giebichenstein Castle ==
The Giebichenstein Castle is situated in the north of Giebichenstein district, next to the Saale river.

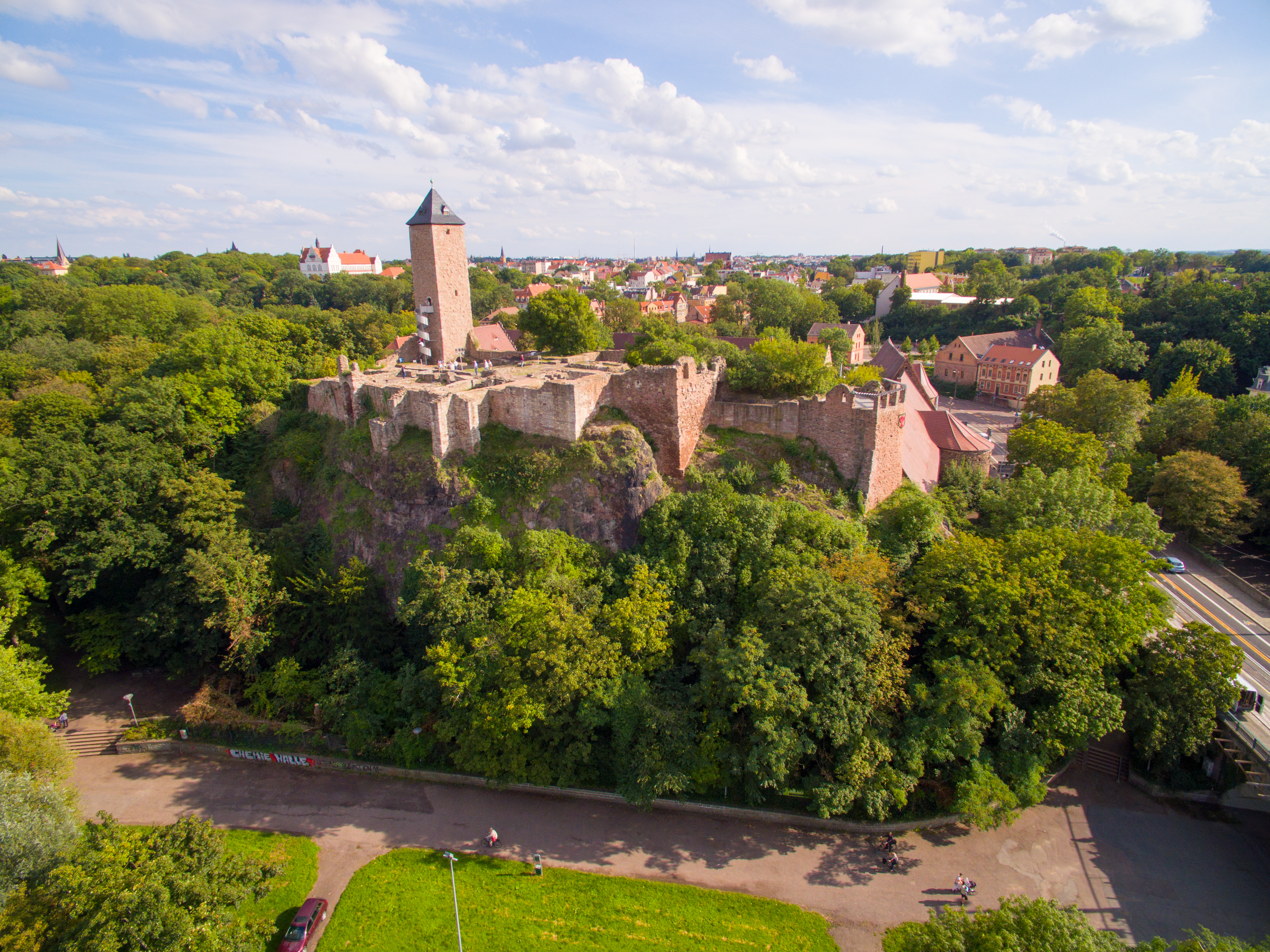
Giebichenstein Castle, pictured in 2015

== See also ==
- Giebichenstein boulder, in Lower Saxony
