= Grüneisen parameter =

Thermodynamical parameter of solids

In condensed matter, Grüneisen parameter γ is a dimensionless thermodynamic parameter named after German physicist Eduard Grüneisen, whose original definition was formulated in terms of the phonon nonlinearities.

Because of the equivalences of many properties and derivatives within thermodynamics (e.g. see Maxwell relations), there are many formulations of the Grüneisen parameter which are equally valid, leading to numerous interpretations of its meaning. Some formulations for the Grüneisen parameter include:
$$\gamma = V \left(\frac{dP}{dE}\right)_V = \frac{\alpha K_T}{C_V \rho} = \frac{\alpha K_S}{C_P \rho} = \frac{\alpha v_s^2}{C_P} = -\left(\frac{\partial \ln T}{\partial \ln V}\right)_S$$
where V is volume, $C_P$ and $C_V$ are the specific (i.e. per-mass) heat capacities at constant pressure and volume, E is energy, S is entropy, α is the volume thermal expansion coefficient, $K_S$ and $K_T$ are the adiabatic and isothermal bulk moduli, $v_s$ is the speed of sound in the medium, and ρ is density. The Grüneisen parameter is dimensionless.

== Grüneisen constant for perfect crystals with pair interactions ==
The expression for the Grüneisen constant of a perfect crystal with pair interactions in $d$-dimensional space has the form:
$$\Gamma_0 = -\frac{1}{2d}\frac{\Pi'''(a)a^2 + (d-1)\left[\Pi''(a)a - \Pi'(a)\right]}{\Pi''(a)a + (d-1)\Pi'(a)},$$
where $\Pi$ is the interatomic potential, $a$ is the equilibrium distance, $d$ is the space dimensionality. Relations between the Grüneisen constant and parameters of Lennard-Jones, Morse, and Mie potentials are presented in the table below.

| Lattice | Dimensionality ($d$) | Lennard-Jones potential | Mie Potential | Morse potential |
|---|---|---|---|---|
| Chain | $1$ | $10\frac{1}{2}$ | $\frac{m+n+3}{2}$ | $\frac{3\alpha a}{2}$ |
| Triangular lattice | $2$ | $5$ | $\frac{m+n+2}{4}$ | $\frac{3\alpha a - 1}{4}$ |
| FCC, BCC | $3$ | $\frac{19}{6}$ | $\frac{n+m+1}{6}$ | $\frac{3\alpha a-2}{6}$ |
| "Hyperlattice" | $\infty$ | $-\frac{1}{2}$ | $-\frac{1}{2}$ | $-\frac{1}{2}$ |
| General formula | {\displaystyle } | $\frac{11}{d}-\frac{1}{2}$ | $\frac{m+n+4}{2d}-\frac{1}{2}$ | $\frac{3\alpha a + 1}{2d}-\frac{1}{2}$ |

The expression for the Grüneisen constant of a 1D chain with Mie potential exactly coincides with the results of MacDonald and Roy. Using the relation between the Grüneisen parameter and interatomic potential one can derive the simple necessary and sufficient condition for Negative Thermal Expansion in perfect crystals with pair interactions $\Pi'''(a) a > -(d-1)\Pi''(a).$ A proper description of the Grüneisen parameter represents a stringent test for any type of interatomic potential.

== Microscopic definition via the phonon frequencies ==
The physical meaning of the parameter can also be extended by combining thermodynamics with a reasonable microphysics model for the vibrating atoms within a crystal. When the restoring force acting on an atom displaced from its equilibrium position is linear in the atom's displacement, the frequencies ω_{i} of individual phonons do not depend on the volume of the crystal or on the presence of other phonons, and the thermal expansion (and thus γ) is zero. When the restoring force is non-linear in the displacement, the phonon frequencies ω_{i} change with the volume $V$. The Grüneisen parameter of an individual vibrational mode $i$ can then be defined as (the negative of) the logarithmic derivative of the corresponding frequency $\omega_i$:

$$\gamma_i= - \frac{V}{\omega_i} \frac{\partial \omega_i}{\partial V}.$$

== Relationship between microscopic and thermodynamic models ==
Using the quasi-harmonic approximation for atomic vibrations, the macroscopic Grüneisen parameter (γ) can be related to the description of how the vibrational frequencies (phonons) within a crystal are altered with changing volume (i.e. γ_{i}'s). For example, one can show that
$$\gamma = \frac{\alpha K_T}{C_V \rho}$$
if one defines $\gamma$ as the weighted average
$$\gamma = \frac{\sum_i \gamma_i c_{V,i} }{ \sum_i c_{V,i} },$$
where $c_{V,i}$'s are the partial vibrational mode contributions to the heat capacity, such that $C_{V} = \frac{1}{\rho V} \sum_i c_{V,i} .$

=== Proof ===
To prove this relation, it is easiest to introduce the heat capacity per particle $\tilde{C}_V = \sum_i c_{V,i}$; so one can write
$$\frac{\sum_i \gamma_i c_{V,i}}{\tilde{C}_V} = \frac{\alpha K_T}{C_V \rho} = \frac{\alpha V K_T}{\tilde{C}_V}.$$

This way, it suffices to prove
$$\sum_i \gamma_i c_{V,i} = \alpha V K_T.$$

Left-hand side (def):
$$\sum_i \gamma_i c_{V,i} = \sum_i \left[- \frac{V}{\omega_i} \frac{\partial \omega_i}{ \partial V} \right] \left[ k_{\rm B} \left(\frac{\hbar \omega_i}{k_{\rm B} T}\right)^2 \frac{\exp\left( \frac{\hbar \omega_i}{k_{\rm B} T} \right)}{\left[\exp\left(\frac{\hbar \omega_i}{k_{\rm B} T}\right) - 1\right]^2} \right]$$

Right-hand side (def):
$$\alpha V K_T = \left[ \frac{1}{V} \left(\frac{\partial V}{ \partial T}\right)_P \right] V \left[-V \left(\frac{\partial P}{\partial V}\right)_T\right] = - V \left( \frac{\partial V}{\partial T} \right)_P \left(\frac{\partial P}{\partial V}\right)_T$$

Furthermore (Maxwell relations):
$$\left( \frac{\partial V}{\partial T} \right)_P = \frac{\partial}{\partial T} \left(\frac{\partial G}{\partial P}\right)_T = \frac{\partial}{\partial P} \left(\frac{\partial G}{\partial T}\right)_P = - \left( \frac{\partial S}{\partial P} \right)_T$$

Thus
$$\alpha V K_T = V \left( \frac{\partial S}{\partial P} \right)_T \left(\frac{\partial P}{\partial V}\right)_T = V \left( \frac{\partial S}{\partial V} \right)_T$$

This derivative is straightforward to determine in the quasi-harmonic approximation, as only the ω_{i} are V-dependent.

$$\frac{\partial S}{\partial V} = \frac{\partial }{\partial V} \left\{ - \sum_i k_{\rm B} \ln\left[ 1 - \exp\left( -\frac{\hbar\omega_i (V)}{k_{\rm B}T} \right) \right] + \sum_i \frac{1}{T} \frac{\hbar\omega_i (V)}{\exp\left(\frac{\hbar\omega_i (V)}{k_{\rm B}T}\right) - 1} \right\}$$

$$V \frac{\partial S}{\partial V} = - \sum_i \frac{V}{\omega_i} \frac{\partial \omega_i}{\partial V} \;\; k_{\rm B} \left(\frac{\hbar \omega_i}{k_{\rm B}T}\right)^2 \frac{\exp\left( \frac{\hbar \omega_i}{k_{\rm B} T} \right)}{\left[\exp\left(\frac{\hbar \omega_i}{k_{\rm B} T}\right) - 1\right]^2} = \sum_i \gamma_i c_{V,i}$$

This yields
$$\gamma = \dfrac{\sum_i \gamma_i c_{V,i}}{\sum_i c_{V,i}} = \dfrac{\alpha V K_T}{\tilde{C}_V}.$$

== The Grüneisen parameter in the framework of nonextensive statistical mechanics ==
Regarding Boltzmann-Gibbs (BG) statistical mechanics, it is reported in the literature that the Grüneisen parameter presents an expressive enhancement close to critical points (CPs) and phase transitions. However, for genuine quantum critical phenomena, i.e., in the complete absence of temperature T, a thermodynamic definition of the Grüneisen parameter is elusive because it embodies dependences with temperature and exactly at T = 0K the Grüneisen parameter is undetermined. Nevertheless, a quantum version $\Gamma^{0\text{K}}$ was recently proposed. Using the 1D Ising model under a transverse magnetic field (1DIMTF) the authors have shown that, for the quantum CP of such a model, $\Gamma^{0\text{K}}$ shows a divergent-like behavior when the magnetic energy B is comparable to the exchange coupling energy J. Such behavior is associated with the breakdown of the Boltzmann-Gibbs-von Neumann-Shannon entropy extensivity in this regime, which leads to zeros and infinities in physical quantities such as the Grüneisen parameter. However, upon employing the generalized nonadditive entropy $S_q$, Constantino Tsallis demonstrated that for a unique value of the entropic index q, $S_q$ is extensive right at the CP of the 1DIMTF. Hence, upon making an unprecedented connection of $\Gamma^{0\text{K}}$ in terms of $S_q$ and using the 1DIMTF, researchers from Physics Department - Unesp, Rio Claro, have shown that $\Gamma^{0\text{K}}$ is universally nondivergent when using the appropriate entropy for the critical regime. Such results suggest that the divergent-like behavior of physical quantities associated with the nonvalidity of BG statistical mechanics should be revisited in terms of $S_q$.

== See also ==
- Debye model
- Negative thermal expansion
- Mie–Grüneisen equation of state
