= Mie–Grüneisen equation of state =

Equation for the pressure within a solid

The Mie–Grüneisen equation of state is an equation of state that relates the pressure and volume of a solid at a given temperature. It is used to determine the pressure in a shock-compressed solid. The Mie–Grüneisen relation is a special form of the Grüneisen model which describes the effect that changing the volume of a crystal lattice has on its vibrational properties. Several variations of the Mie–Grüneisen equation of state are in use.

The Grüneisen model can be expressed in the form
$$\Gamma = V \left(\frac{dp}{de}\right)_V$$
where V is the volume, p is the pressure, e is the internal energy, and Γ is the Grüneisen parameter which represents the thermal pressure from a set of vibrating atoms. If we assume that Γ is independent of p and e, we can integrate Grüneisen's model to get
$$p - p_0 = \frac{\Gamma}{V} (e - e_0)$$
where $p_0$ and $e_0$ are the pressure and internal energy at a reference state usually assumed to be the state at which the temperature is 0K. In that case p_{0} and e_{0} are independent of temperature and the values of these quantities can be estimated from the Hugoniot equations. The Mie–Grüneisen equation of state is a special form of the above equation.

== History ==
Gustav Mie, in 1903, developed an intermolecular potential for deriving high-temperature equations of state of solids. In 1912, Eduard Grüneisen extended Mie's model to temperatures below the Debye temperature at which quantum effects become important. Grüneisen's form of the equations is more convenient and has become the usual starting point for deriving Mie–Grüneisen equations of state.

== Expressions for the Mie–Grüneisen equation of state ==
A temperature-corrected version that is used in computational mechanics has the form

$$p = \frac{\rho_0 C_0^2 \chi}{\left(1 - s\chi\right)^2} \left[1 - \frac{\Gamma_0}{2}\,\chi\right] + \Gamma_0 E;\quad
\chi := 1-\cfrac{\rho_0}{\rho}$$
where $C_0$ is the bulk speed of sound, $\rho_0$ is the initial density, $\rho$ is the current density, $\Gamma_0$ is Grüneisen's gamma at the reference state, $s = dU_s/dU_p$ is a linear Hugoniot slope coefficient, $U_s$ is the shock wave velocity, $U_p$ is the particle velocity, and $E$ is the internal energy per unit reference volume. An alternative form is
$$p = \frac{\rho_0 C_0^2 (\eta -1)}{\left[\eta - s(\eta-1)\right]^2} \left[\eta - \frac{\Gamma_0}{2}(\eta-1)\right] + \Gamma_0 E;\quad
\eta := \cfrac{\rho}{\rho_0} \,.$$
A rough estimate of the internal energy can be computed using
$$E = \frac{1}{V_0} \int C_v dT \approx \frac{C_v (T-T_0)}{V_0} = \rho_0 c_v (T-T_0)$$
where $V_0$ is the reference volume at temperature $T = T_0$, $C_v$ is the heat capacity and $c_v$ is the specific heat capacity at constant volume. In many simulations, it is assumed that $C_p$ and $C_v$ are equal.

=== Parameters for various materials ===
material	$\rho_0$ (kg/m^{3})	$c_v$ (J/kg-K)	$C_0$ (m/s)	$s$	$\Gamma_0$ ($T < T_1$)	$\Gamma_0$ ($T \geq T_1$)	$T_1$ (K)
Copper	8960	390	3933	1.5	1.99	2.12	700

== Derivation of the equation of state ==
From Grüneisen's model we have

$$p - p_0 = \frac{\Gamma}{V} (e - e_0)$$	1

where $p_0$ and $e_0$ are the pressure and internal energy at a reference state. The Hugoniot equations for the conservation of mass, momentum, and energy are
$$\begin{align}
\rho_0 U_s &= \rho \left(U_s - U_p\right) \,, \\[1ex]
p_H - p_{H0} &= \rho_0 U_s U_p \,, \\[1ex]
p_H U_p &= \rho_0 U_s \left(\tfrac{1}{2}U_p^2 + E_H - E_{H0}\right)
\end{align}$$
where ρ_{0} is the reference density, ρ is the density due to shock compression, p_{H} is the pressure on the Hugoniot, E_{H} is the internal energy per unit mass on the Hugoniot, U_{s} is the shock velocity, and U_{p} is the particle velocity. From the conservation of mass, we have
$$\frac{U_p}{U_s} = 1 - \frac{\rho_0}{\rho} = 1 - \frac{V}{V_0} =: \chi \,.$$
Where we defined $V = 1/\rho$, the specific volume (volume per unit mass). For many materials U_{s} and U_{p} are linearly related, i.e., U_{s} = C_{0} + s U_{p} where C_{0} and s depend on the material. In that case, we have
$$U_s = C_0 + s\chi U_s \quad \text{or} \quad U_s = \frac{C_0}{1 - s\chi} \,.$$
The momentum equation can then be written (for the principal Hugoniot where p_{H0} is zero) as
$$p_H = \rho_0 \chi U_s^2 = \frac{\rho_0 C_0^2 \chi}{\left(1 - s\chi\right)^2} \,.$$
Similarly, from the energy equation we have
$$p_H \chi U_s = \tfrac{1}{2} \rho \chi^2 U_s^3 + \rho_0 U_s E_H = \tfrac{1}{2} p_H \chi U_s + \rho_0 U_s E_H \,.$$
Solving for e_{H}, we have
$$E_H = \tfrac{1}{2} \frac{p_H \chi}{\rho_0} = \tfrac{1}{2} p_H (V_0 - V)$$
With these expressions for p_{H} and E_{H}, the Grüneisen model on the Hugoniot becomes
$$p_H - p_0 = \frac{\Gamma}{V} \left(\frac{p_H \chi V_0}{2} - e_0\right)$$
or
$$\frac{\rho_0 C_0^2 \chi}{\left(1 - s\chi\right)^2}\left(1 - \frac{\chi}{2}\,\frac{\Gamma}{V} \,V_0\right) - p_0 = -\frac{\Gamma}{V} e_0 \,.$$
If we assume that Γ/V = Γ_{0}/V_{0} and note that $p_0 = -d e_0/d V$, we get

$$\frac{\rho C_0^2 \chi}{(1 - s\chi)^2}\left(1 - \frac{\Gamma_0\chi}{2}\right) + \frac{d e_0}{d V} + \frac{\Gamma_0}{V_0} e_0 = 0\,.$$	2

The above ordinary differential equation can be solved for e_{0} with the initial condition e_{0} = 0 when V = V_{0} (χ = 0). The exact solution is
$$\begin{align}
e_0 =  \frac{\rho C_0^2 V_0}{2 s^4} \Biggl[
&\exp(\Gamma_0\chi) \left(\tfrac{\Gamma_0}{s} - 3 \right) s^2 - \frac{ s^2}{1 - s\chi} \left[\tfrac{\Gamma_0}{s} - (3 - s\chi)\right] + \\
& \exp\left[-\tfrac{\Gamma_0}{s} (1-s\chi)\right] \left(\Gamma_0^2 - 4 \Gamma_0 s + 2 s^2\right) \left(\text{Ei}\left[\tfrac{\Gamma_0}{s} (1-s\chi )\right] - \text{Ei}\left[\tfrac{\Gamma_0}{s}\right]\right)
\Biggr]
\end{align}$$
where Ei[z] is the exponential integral. The expression for p_{0} is
$$\begin{align}
p_0 &= -\frac{de_0}{dV} \\
&= \frac{\rho C_0^2}{2s^4(1-\chi)} \Biggl[
\frac{s}{(1 - s\chi)^2} \Bigl (- \Gamma_0^2(1 - \chi)(1 -s\chi)
+ \Gamma_0 [s \{4 (\chi-1) \chi s-2 \chi+3\}-1] \\
& \quad\qquad\qquad\qquad\qquad\qquad\quad - \exp(\Gamma_0\chi)[\Gamma_0(\chi-1) -1](1-s\chi)^2(\Gamma_0-3s) + s [3-\chi s \{(\chi-2) s+4\}]\Bigr) \\
& \quad\qquad\qquad\qquad - \exp\left[-\tfrac{\Gamma_0}{s} (1-s\chi)\right] \left[\Gamma_0(\chi-1) - 1\right] \left(\Gamma_0^2 - 4 \Gamma_0 s + 2 s^2\right) \left(\text{Ei}\left[\tfrac{\Gamma_0}{s} (1-s\chi )\right] - \text{Ei}\left[\tfrac{\Gamma_0}{s}\right]\right)
\Biggr] \,.
\end{align}$$

Plots of e_{0} and p_{0} for copper as a function of χ.

For commonly encountered compression problems, an approximation to the exact solution is a power series solution of the form
$$e_0(V) = A + B \chi(V) + C \chi^2(V) + D \chi^3(V) + \cdots$$
and
$$p_0(V) = -\frac{de_0}{dV} = -\frac{de_0}{d\chi}\,\frac{d\chi}{dV} = \frac{1}{V_0}\,(B + 2C\chi + 3D\chi^2 + \cdots) \,.$$
Substitution into the Grüneisen model gives us the Mie–Grüneisen equation of state
$$p = \frac{1}{V_0}\,(B + 2C\chi + 3D\chi^2 + \cdots) + \frac{\Gamma_0}{V_0} \left[e - (A + B \chi + C \chi^2 + D \chi^3 + \cdots ) \right] \,.$$
If we assume that the internal energy e_{0} = 0 when V = V_{0} (χ = 0) we have A = 0. Similarly, if we assume p_{0} = 0 when V = V_{0} we have B = 0. The Mie–Grüneisen equation of state can then be written as
$$p = \frac{1}{V_0}\left[2C\chi \left(1-\tfrac{\Gamma_0}{2}\chi\right) + 3D\chi^2\left(1 -\tfrac{\Gamma_0}{3}\chi\right) + \cdots\right] + \Gamma_0 E$$
where E is the internal energy per unit reference volume. Several forms of this equation of state are possible.

Comparison of exact and first-order Mie–Grüneisen equation of state for copper.

If we take the first-order term and substitute it into equation (2), we can solve for C to get
$$C = \frac{\rho_0 C_0^2 V_0}{2 \left(1 - s \chi\right)^2} \,.$$

Then we get the following expression for p:
$$p = \frac{\rho_0 C_0^2 \chi}{\left(1 - s\chi\right)^2} \left(1 - \frac{\Gamma_0}{2} \chi\right) + \Gamma_0 E \,.$$
This is the commonly used first-order Mie–Grüneisen equation of state.

== See also ==
- Impact (mechanics)
- Shock wave
- Shock (mechanics)
- Shock tube
- Hydrostatic shock
- Viscoplasticity
