= Quasi-harmonic approximation =

The quasi-harmonic approximation is a phonon-based model of solid-state physics used to describe volume-dependent thermal effects, such as the thermal expansion. It is based on the assumption that the harmonic approximation holds for every value of the lattice constant, which is to be viewed as an adjustable parameter.

== Overview ==
The quasi-harmonic approximation expands upon the harmonic phonon model of lattice dynamics. The harmonic phonon model states that all interatomic forces are purely harmonic, but such a model is inadequate to explain thermal expansion, as the equilibrium distance between atoms in such a model is independent of temperature.

Thus in the quasi-harmonic model, from a phonon point of view, phonon frequencies become volume-dependent in the quasi-harmonic approximation, such that for each volume, the harmonic approximation holds.

== Thermodynamics ==
For a lattice, the Helmholtz free energy F in the quasi-harmonic approximation is

$F(T,V) = E_{\rm lat}(V) + U_{\rm vib}(T,V) - T S(T,V)$

where E_{lat} is the static internal lattice energy, U_{vib} is the internal vibrational energy of the lattice, or the energy of the phonon system, T is the absolute temperature, V is the volume and S is the entropy due to the vibrational degrees of freedom. The vibrational energy equals

$U_{\rm vib}(T,V) = \frac{1}{N} \sum_{\mathbf{k}, i} \frac{1}{2} \hbar \omega_{\mathbf{k},i}(V) + \frac{1}{N} \sum_{\mathbf{k}, i} \frac{\hbar \omega_{\mathbf{k},i}(V)}{\exp(\Theta_{\mathbf{k},i}(V) / T) - 1} = \frac{1}{N} \sum_{\mathbf{k}, i}[\frac{1}{2} + n_{\mathbf{k},i}(T,V)] \hbar \omega_{\mathbf{k},i}(V)$

where N is the number of terms in the sum, $\Theta_{\mathbf{k},i}(V) = \hbar \omega_{\mathbf{k},i}(V) / k_B$ is introduced as the characteristic temperature for a phonon with wave vector k in the i-th band at volume V and $n_{\mathbf{k},i}(T,V)$ is shorthand for the number of (k,i)-phonons at temperature T and volume V. As is conventional, $\hbar$ is the reduced Planck constant and k_{B} is the Boltzmann constant. The first term in U_{vib} is the zero-point energy of the phonon system and contributes to the thermal expansion as a zero-point thermal pressure.

The Helmholtz free energy F is given by

$F = E_{\rm lat}(V) + \frac{1}{N} \sum_{\mathbf{k}, i} \frac{1}{2}\hbar \omega_{\mathbf{k}, i}(V) + \frac{1}{N} \sum_{\mathbf{k}, i} k_BT \ln \left[ 1 - \exp(-\Theta_{\mathbf{k}, i}(V) / T) \right]$

and the entropy term equals

$S = -\left(\frac{\partial F}{\partial T}\right)_V = -\frac{1}{N} \sum_{\mathbf{k}, i} k_B \ln \left[ 1 - \exp(-\Theta_{\mathbf{k}, i}(V) / T) \right] + \frac{1}{N T} \sum_{\mathbf{k}, i} \frac{\hbar \omega_{\mathbf{k},i}(V)}{\exp(\Theta_{\mathbf{k},i}(V) / T) - 1}$,

from which F = U - TS is easily verified.

The frequency ω as a function of k is the dispersion relation. Note that for a constant value of V, these equations corresponds to that of the harmonic approximation.

By applying a Legendre transformation, it is possible to obtain the Gibbs free energy G of the system as a function of temperature and pressure.

$G(T,P) = \min_V \left[ E_{\rm lat}(V) + U_{\rm vib}(V,T) - T S(T,V) + P V \right]$

Where P is the pressure. The minimal value for G is found at the equilibrium volume for a given T and P.

== Derivable quantities ==
Once the Gibbs free energy is known, many thermodynamic quantities can be determined as first- or second-order derivatives. Below are a few which cannot be determined through the harmonic approximation alone.

=== Equilibrium volume ===
V(P,T) is determined as a function of pressure and temperature by minimizing the Gibbs free energy.

=== Thermal expansion ===
The volumetric thermal expansion α_{V} can be derived from V(P,T) as

$\alpha_V = \frac{1}{V} \left(\frac{\partial V}{\partial T}\right)_P$

=== Grüneisen parameter ===
The Grüneisen parameter γ is defined for every phonon mode as

$\gamma_i = - \frac{\partial \ln \omega_i}{\partial \ln V}$

where i indicates a phonon mode. The total Grüneisen parameter is the sum of all γ_{i}s. It is a measure of the anharmonicity of the system and closely related to the thermal expansion.
