= Optothermal stability =

Optothermal stability describes the rate at which an optical element distorts due to a changing thermal environment. A changing thermal environment can cause an optic to bend due to either 1) changing thermal gradients on the optic and a non-zero coefficient of thermal expansion, or 2) coefficient of thermal expansion gradients in an optic and an average temperature change. Therefore, optothermal stability is an issue for optics that are present in a changing thermal environment. For example, a space telescope will experience variable heat loads from changes in spacecraft attitude, solar flux, planetary albedo, and planetary infrared emissions. Optothermal stability can be important when measuring the surface figure of optics, because thermal changes are typically low frequency (diurnal or HVAC cycling) which makes it difficult to use measurement averaging (commonly used for other error types) to remove errors. Also, optothermal stability is important for optical systems which require a high level of stability such as those that use a coronagraph.

== Material characterization ==
Material characterization numbers have been mathematically derived to describe the rate at which a material deforms due to an external thermal input. There is a distinction between wavefront stability (dynamic) and wavefront error (static). A higher Massive Optothermal Stability (MOS) and Optothermal Stability (OS) number will result in greater stability. As shown in the equation, MOS increases with density. Because added weight is undesirable for non-thermal reasons, especially in spaceflight applications, both MOS and OS are defined below:

$MOS = {{\rho c_p} \over \alpha}$

$OS = {c_p \over \alpha}$

Where ρ, c_{p}, α are density, specific heat, and the coefficient of thermal expansion respectively.

== See also ==
- Athermalization
