= ALLVAR Alloy 30 =

Negative Thermal Expansion Alloy

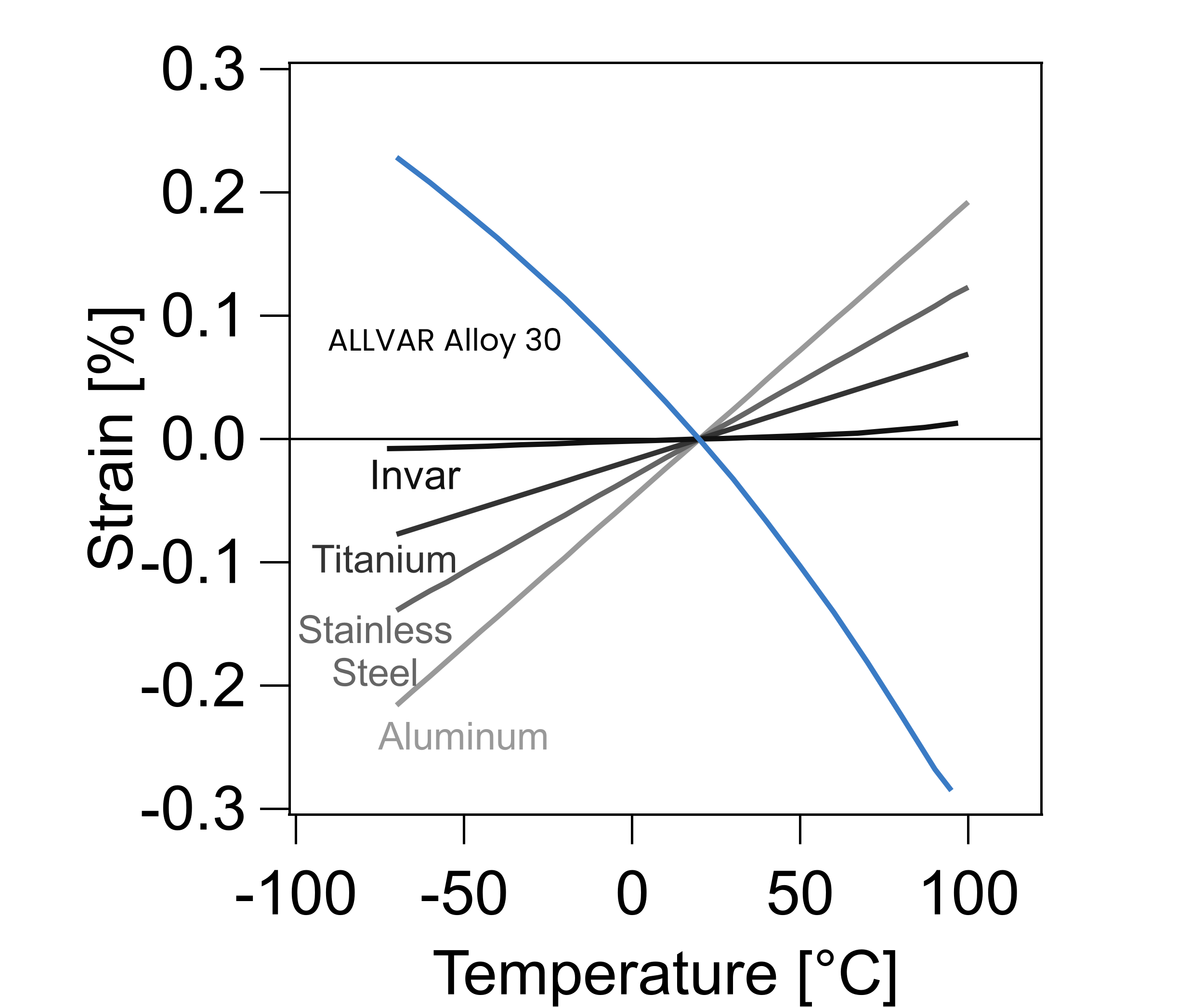
Negative Thermal Expansion ALLVAR Alloy 30's strain compared to other common materials.

ALLVAR Alloy 30 is a titanium-based metal alloy with a negative coefficient of thermal expansion (CTE), causing it to contract when heated and expand when cooled. ALLVAR Alloy 30 is used in industries such as aerospace, optics, and cryogenics to stabilize the dimensional stability of assemblies across temperature variations. It has a -30 ppm/°C coefficient of thermal expansion that can compensate for materials with a positive thermal expansion. It has been used to create athermal telescopes, refractive optics, and constant preload fastened joints for environments with significant temperature fluctuations. Compared to traditional low-CTE materials like Invar, potential advantages include mass savings, non-magnetic properties, and corrosion resistance.

== Applications ==
ALLVAR Alloy 30 is used where high dimensional stability is required in fields like aerospace, precision instrumentation, and cryogenics. By compensating for the positive thermal expansion of dissimilar materials, ALLVAR Alloy 30's negative coefficient of thermal expansion is utilized to create stable components and structures.

ALLVAR Alloy 30 is utilized in the production of washers and spacers designed to maintain consistent preload in bolted joints across temperature changes. Due to its negative coefficient of thermal expansion (CTE), -30 ppm/°C along its axial direction, ALLVAR Alloy 30 spacers compensate for the thermal expansion miss-match between common engineering materials such as steel or aluminum. This property ensures stable bolt tension in applications subject to large temperature changes and thermal cycling, such as cryogenic systems or high-precision assemblies.

In optics and precision engineering, ALLVAR Alloy 30 housings and spacers are used to stabilize assemblies against temperature-induced dimensional changes. They can compensate for the expansion of other components, maintaining alignment in systems like space telescopes, lens housings, or ultra-precision scientific instruments.

ALLVAR Alloy 30 has also been used for passive cryogenic thermal switches. These thermal switches use a combination of large magnitude positive and negative coefficient of thermal expansion (CTE) materials to switch between high and low thermal conductance for environments with large heat variation such as lunar day/night cycles.

== Properties ==
ALLVAR Alloy 30 is a fully dense titanium alloy.

- Negative thermal expansion: −30ppm/°C at 25 °C with a mean CTE of −29ppm/°C between −40 °C and 80 °C.
- Machinability similar to other titanium alloys.
- Nonmagnetic

=== Physical properties ===
- Density: 5.08 g/cm^{3}
- Coefficient of thermal expansion (−40 °C to 80 °C): −29 × 10^{−6}/K
- Thermal conductivity: 8.8 W/(m·K)
- Maximum application temperature: 100 °C
- Yield Stress: 295 MPa
- Ultimate tensile strength: 650 MPa
- Elastic modulus: 55 GPa

== See also ==
- Thermal expansion
- Negative Thermal Expansion
- Athermalization
- Invar
- Zerodur
