= Athermalization =

Process of achieving optothermal stability in optomechanical systems

Athermalization, in the field of optics, is the process of achieving optothermal stability in optomechanical systems. This is done by minimizing variations in optical performance over a range of temperatures.

Optomechanical systems are typically made of several materials with different thermal properties. These materials compose the optics (refractive or reflective elements) and the mechanics (optical mounts and system housing). As the temperature of these materials change, the volume and index of refraction will change as well, increasing strain and aberration content (primarily defocus). Compensating for optical variations over a temperature range is known as athermalizing a system in optical engineering.

Geometric ray trace (transmitting and refracting) of a positive Schott N-BK7 singlet (single glass type lens element) at 22 C. Red rays are from the 0 degree Y-field angle and blue rays are from the 2 degree Y-field angle.

== Material property changes ==
Image generated in MATLAB by geometric ray tracing 1E6 rays through a positive N-BK7 singlet at a 2 degree Y-field angle. Singlet is in an aluminum 6061 housing cycled from −30 °C to 70 °C. Change in spot size and position is from variations in extensive and intensive properties as a function of temperature.

Thermal expansion is the driving phenomena for the extensive and intensive property changes in an optomechanical system.

=== Extensive properties ===
Extensive property changes, such as volume, alter the shape of optical and mechanical components. Systems are geometrically optimized for optical performance and are sensitive to components changing shape and orientation. While volume is a three dimensional parameter, thermal changes can be modeled in a single dimension with linear expansion, assuming an adequately small temperature range. For examples, glass manufacturer Schott provides the coefficient of linear thermal expansion for a temperature range of −30 °C to 70 °C. The change in length of a material is a function of the change in temperature with respect to the standard measurement temperature, $T_0$. This temperature is typically room temperature or 22 degrees Celsius.

$$\Delta T = T - T_{0}\,$$
$$L_{\left(T\right)}= L_0 + \Delta L = \left(1+\alpha\Delta T\right)L_0\,$$

Where $L_{\left(T\right)}$ is the length of a material at temperature $T$, $L_0$ is the length of the material at temperature $T_0$, $\Delta T$ is the change in temperature, and $\alpha$ is the coefficient of thermal expansion. These equations describe how diameter, thickness, radius of curvature, and element spacing change as a function of temperature.

=== Intensive properties ===
Dispersion of N-BK7 over the visible spectrum using coefficients from the Schott Optical Glass Data Sheets.

The dominant intensive property change, in terms of optical performance, is the index of refraction. The refractive index of glass is a function of wavelength and temperature. There are multiple formulas that can be used to define the wavelength dependence, or dispersion, of a glass. Following the notation from Schott, the empirical Sellmeier equation is shown below.

$$n_{\left(\lambda,\ T_0\right)}=\sqrt{1+\frac{B_1\lambda^2}{\lambda^2-C_1}+\frac{B_2\lambda^2}{\lambda^2-C_2}+\frac{B_3\lambda^2}{\lambda^2-C_3}}\,$$

Temperature coefficients of the absolute refractive index of N-BK7 for the d, F, C spectrum.

Where $\lambda$ is wavelength and $B_1$, $B_2$, $B_3$, $C_1$, $C_2$, and $C_3$ are the Sellmeier coefficients. These coefficients can be found in glass catalogs provided from manufacturers and are usually valid from the near-ultraviolet to the near-infrared. For wavelengths beyond this range, it is necessary to know the material's transmittance with respect to wavelength. From the dispersion formula, the temperature dependence of refractive index can be written:

$$\frac{dn_{abs\left(\lambda,\ T\right)}}{dT}=\frac{n_{\left(\lambda,\ T_0\right)}^2-1}{2n_{\left(\lambda,\ T_0\right)}}\left(D_0+2D_1\Delta T+3D_2\Delta T^2+\frac{E_0+2E_1\Delta T}{\lambda^2-\lambda_{TK}^2}\right)\,$$

and

$$n_{\left(\lambda,\ T\right)}=\left(1+\Delta T\frac{dn_{abs\left(\lambda,\ T\right)}}{dT}\right)n_{\left(\lambda,\ T_0\right)}\,$$

Where $D_0$, $D_1$, $D_2$, $E_0$, $E_1$, and $\lambda_{TK}$ are glass-dependent constants for an optic in vacuum. The power of an optic as a function of temperature can be written from the equations for extensive and intensive property changes, in addition to the lensmaker's equation.

$$\Phi_{lens\left(\lambda,\ T\right)}=\left(n_{\left(\lambda,\ T\right)}-1\right)\left(\frac{1}{R_{1\left(T\right)}}-\frac{1}{R_{2\left(T\right)}}+\frac{\left(n_{\left(\lambda,\ T\right)}-1\right)L_{\left(T\right)}}{{n_{\left(T\right)}R}_{1\left(T\right)}R_{2\left(T\right)}}\right)\,$$

$$\Phi_{mirror\ \left(T\right)}=\frac{-2}{R_{(T)}}\,$$

Where $\Phi$ is optical power, $R$ is the radius of curvature, $L$ is the thickness of the lens. These equations assume spherical surfaces of curvature. If a system is not in vacuum, the index of refraction for air will vary with temperature and pressure according to the Ciddor equation, a modified version of the Edlén equation.

Comparison of optical performance over temperature with different mechanical housing materials for a positive N-BK7 singlet designed at 22 C. "No thermal expansion" still includes effects from dn/dT.

== Athermalization techniques ==
To account for optical variations introduced by extensive and intensive property changes in materials, systems can be athermalized through material selection or feedback loops.

=== Passive athermalization ===
Passive athermalization works by choosing materials for a system that will compensate the overall change in system performance. The simplest way to do this is to choose materials for the optics and mechanics which have low CTE and $\frac{dn}{dT}$ values. This technique is not always possible as glass types are primarily chosen based on their refractive index and dispersion characteristics at operating temperature. Alternatively, mechanical materials can be chosen which have CTE values complementary to the change in focus introduced by the optics. A material with the preferred CTE is not always available, so two materials can be used in conjunction to effectively get the desired CTE value. Negative thermal expansion materials have recently increased the range of potential CTEs available, expanding passive athermalization options.

=== Active athermalization ===
When optical designs do not permit the selection of materials based on their thermal characteristics, passive athermalization may not be a viable technique. For example, the use of germanium in mid to long wave infrared systems is common because of its exceptional optical properties (high index of refraction and low dispersion). Unfortunately, germanium is also known for its large $\frac{dn}{dT}$ value, which makes it difficult to passively athermalize.

Because the primary aberration induced by temperature change is defocus, an optical element, group, or focal plane can be mechanically moved to refocus a system and account for thermal changes. Actively athermalized systems are designed with a feedback loop including a motor, for the focusing mechanism, and temperature sensor, to indicate the magnitude of the focus adjustment.

== Temperature gradients ==
When a system is not in thermal equilibrium, it complicates the process of determining system performance. A common temperature gradient to encounter is an axial gradient. This involves temperatures changing in a lens as a function of the thickness of the lens, or often along the optical axis. In optical lens design it is standard notation for the optical axis to be co-linear with the Z-axis in cartesian coordinates. A difference between the temperature of the first and second surface of a lens will cause the lens to bend. This affects each radius of curvature, therefor changing the optical power of the lens. The radius of curvature change is a function of the temperature gradient in the optic.

$$R = (R_0 + \Delta R) = \left(1 -\alpha R_0 \frac{dT}{dL} \right) R_0\,$$

Where $L$ is the thickness of the lens. Radial gradients are less predictable as they may cause the shape of curvature to change, making spherical surfaces aspherical. Determining temperature gradients in an optomechanical system can quickly become an arduous task, requiring an intimate understanding of the heat sources and sinks in a system. Temperature gradients are determined by heat flow and can be a result of conduction, convection, or radiation. Whether steady-state or transient solutions are adequate for an analysis is determined by operating requirements, system design, and the environment. It can be beneficial to leverage the computational power of the finite element method to solve the applicable heat flow equations to determine the temperature gradients of optical and mechanical components.
