= Autovent =

An autovent is a device for maintaining a greenhouse or conservatory within a range of temperatures. The basic principle is that as greenhouse heats above ambient the air inside becomes lighter, the vent opens when a certain temperature is reached and lets the hot air out — drawing cooler air in from outside.

== Mechanism ==
The force to open the vent is provided a number of ways, the most common being through thermal expansion and by electric motors. Thermal expansion based actuators use either the differential expansion rate of different materials (bimetallic strips) or special fluids with large coefficient of thermal expansion in pistons. This approach is cheap, reliable and passive (requires no external energy).

Electric motors (usually servo motors) are usually controlled by an electronic sensor, and can be more accurately programmed. The vents can form part of a more complex climate control system for controlling humidity, fresh air rate and temperature. The most sophisticated systems use a dedicated computer to control watering, cooling (usually evaporative cooling), heating, lighting, CO_{2} injection fertilization and air flow.
