= Rigid unit modes =

Modes in crystallography and materials science

Rigid unit modes (RUMs) represent a class of lattice vibrations or phonons that exist in network materials such as quartz, cristobalite or zirconium tungstate. Network materials can be described as three-dimensional networks of polyhedral groups of atoms such as SiO_{4} tetrahedra or TiO_{6} octahedra. A RUM is a lattice vibration in which the polyhedra are able to move, by translation and/or rotation, without distorting. RUMs in crystalline materials are the counterparts of floppy modes in glasses, as introduced by Jim Phillips and Mike Thorpe.

== The interest in rigid unit modes ==
The idea of rigid unit modes was developed for crystalline materials to enable an understanding of the origin of displacive phase transitions in materials such as silicates, which can be described as infinite three-dimensional networks of corner-lined SiO_{4} and AlO_{4} tetrahedra. The idea was that rigid unit modes could act as the soft modes for displacive phase transitions.

The original work in silicates showed that many of the phase transitions in silicates could be understood in terms of soft modes that are RUMs.

After the original work on displacive phase transitions, the RUM model was also applied to understanding the nature of the disordered high-temperature phases of materials such as cristobalite, the dynamics and localised structural distortions in zeolites, and negative thermal expansion.

== Why rigid unit modes can exist ==
The simplest way to understand the origin of RUMs is to consider the balance between the numbers of constraints and degrees of freedom of the network, an engineering analysis that dates back to James Clerk Maxwell and which was introduced to amorphous materials by Jim Phillips and Mike Thorpe. If the number of constraints exceeds the number of degrees of freedom, the structure will be rigid. On the other hand, if the number of degrees of freedom exceeds the number of constraints, the structure will be floppy.

For a structure that consists of corner-linked tetrahedra (such as the SiO_{4} tetrahedra in silica, SiO_{2}) we can count the numbers of constraints and degrees of freedom as follows. For a given tetrahedron, the position of any corner has to have its three spatial coordinates (x,y,z) match the spatial coordinates of the corresponding corner of a linked tetrahedron. Thus each corner has three constraints. These are shared by the two linked tetrahedra, so contribute 1.5 constraints to each tetrahedron. There are 4 corners, so we have a total of 6 constraints per tetrahedron. A rigid three-dimensional object has 6 degrees of freedom, 3 translations and 3 rotations. Thus there is an exact balance between the numbers of constraints and degrees of freedom.

(Note that we can get an identical result by considering the atoms to be the basic units. There are 5 atoms in the structural tetrahedron, but 4 of there are shared by two tetrahedra, so that there are 3 + 4*3/2 = 9 degrees of freedom per tetrahedron. The number of constraints to hold together such a tetrahedron is 9 (4 distances and 5 angles)).

What this balance means is that a structure composed of structural tetrahedra joined at corners is exactly on the border between being rigid and floppy. What appears to happen is that symmetry reduces the number of constraints so that structures such as quartz and cristobalite are slightly floppy and thus support some RUMs.

The above analysis can be applied to any network structure composed of polyhedral groups of atoms. One example is the perovskite family of structures, which consist of corner-linked BX_{6} octahedra such as TiO_{6} or ZrO_{6}. A simple counting analysis would in fact suggest that such structures are rigid, but in the ideal cubic phase symmetry allows some degree of flexibility. Zirconium tungstate, the archetypal material showing negative thermal expansion, contains ZrO_{6} octahedra and WO_{4} tetrahedra, with one of the corners of each WO_{4} tetrahedra having no linkage. The counting analysis shows that, like silica, zirconium tungstate has an exact balance between the numbers of constraints and degrees of freedom, and further analysis has shown the existence of RUMs in this material.
