= Zirconium tungstate =

Zirconium(IV) tungstate
- Zirconium(IV) tungstate

Names
- Other names zirconium tungsten oxide

Identifiers
| CAS Number | 16853-74-0 |
| 3D model (JSmol) | Interactive image |
| ChemSpider | 10710102 |
| ECHA InfoCard | 100.037.145 |
| EC Number | 240-876-3 |
| PubChem CID | 21954342 |
- InChI: InChI=1S/8O.2W.Zr/q;;;;4*-1;;;+4 Key: OJLGWNFZMTVNCX-UHFFFAOYSA-N
- SMILES: [O-][W](=O)(=O)[O-].[O-][W](=O)(=O)[O-].[Zr+4]

Properties
| Chemical formula | Zr(WO_{4})_{2} |
| Molar mass | 586.92 g/mol |
| Appearance | white powder |
| Density | 5.09 g/cm^{3}, solid |
| Solubility in water | negligible |

Hazards
- GHS labelling
| Pictograms | (GHS07: Exclamation mark) |
| Signal word | Warning |
| Hazard statements | H315, H319, H335 |
| NFPA 704 (fire diamond) | 2 0 0 |
| Safety data sheet (SDS) | MSDS |
- Except where otherwise noted, data are given for materials in their standard state (at 25 °C [77 °F], 100 kPa). verify (what is ?) Infobox references

Zirconium tungstate is the zirconium salt of tungstic acid with the formula Zr(WO_{4})_{2}. The phase formed at ambient pressure by reaction of ZrO_{2} and WO_{3} is a metastable cubic phase, which has negative thermal expansion characteristics, namely it shrinks over a wide range of temperatures when heated. In contrast to most other ceramics exhibiting negative CTE (coefficient of thermal expansion), the CTE of ZrW_{2}O_{8} is isotropic and has a large negative magnitude (average CTE of −7.2 × 10^{−6}K^{−1}) over a wide range of temperature (−273 °C to 777 °C). A number of other phases are formed at high pressures.

== Cubic phase ==
Cubic zirconium tungstate (alpha-ZrW_{2}O_{8}), one of the several known phases of zirconium tungstate (ZrW_{2}O_{8}) is perhaps one of the most studied materials to exhibit negative thermal expansion. It has been shown to contract continuously over a previously unprecedented temperature range of 0.3 to 1050 K (at higher temperatures the material decomposes). Since the structure is cubic, as described below, the thermal contraction is isotropic - equal in all directions. There is much ongoing research attempting to elucidate why the material exhibits such dramatic negative thermal expansion.

This phase is thermodynamically unstable at room temperature with respect to the binary oxides ZrO_{2} and WO_{3}, but may be synthesised by heating stoichiometric quantities of these oxides together and then quenching the material by rapidly cooling it from approximately 900 °C to room temperature.

The structure of cubic zirconium tungstate consists of corner-sharing ZrO_{6} octahedral and WO_{4} tetrahedral structural units. Its unusual expansion properties are thought to be due to vibrational modes known as Rigid Unit Modes (RUMs), which involve the coupled rotation of the polyhedral units that make up the structure, and lead to contraction.

=== Detailed crystal structure ===
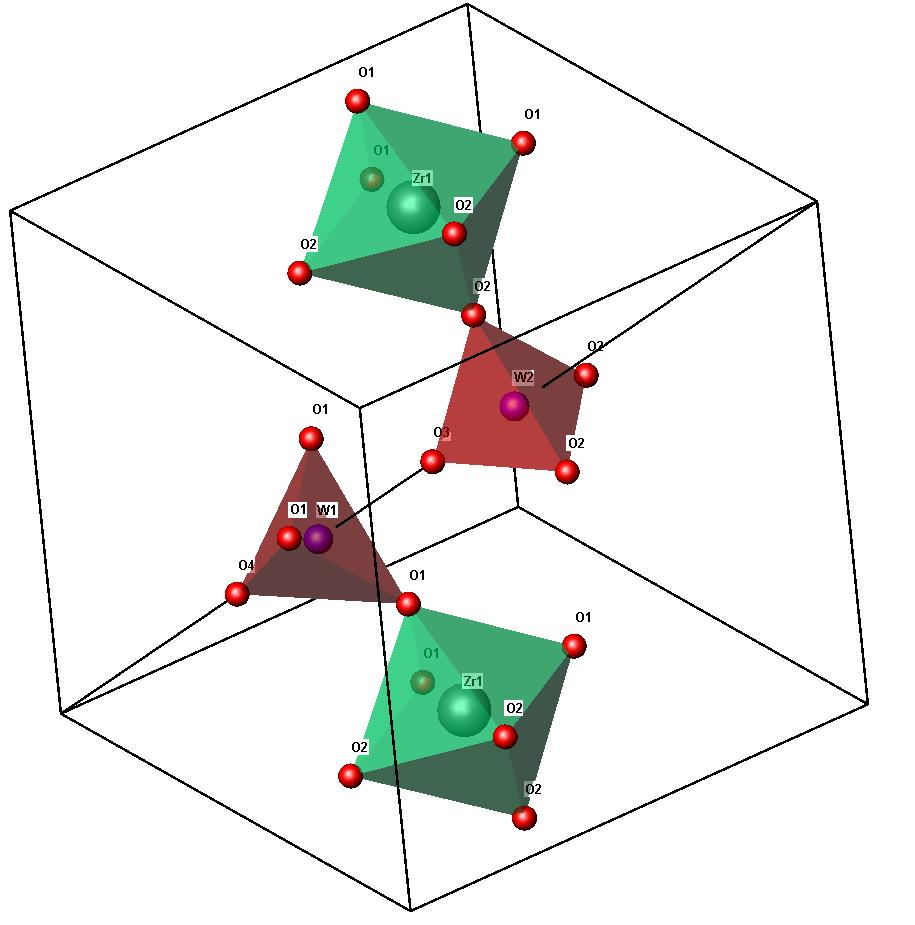
An image of the crystal structure of cubic ZrW_{2}O_{8}, showing the corner-sharing octahedral (ZrO_{6}, in green) and tetrahedral (WO_{4}, in red) structural units. An incomplete unit cell is shown so that the positioning of the W_{2}O_{8} unit along the body diagonal of the unit cell may be seen.

The arrangement of the groups in the structure of cubic ZrW_{2}O_{8} is analogous to the simple NaCl structure, with ZrO_{6} octahedra at the Na sites, and W_{2}O_{8} groups at the Cl sites. The unit cell consists of 44 atoms aligned in a primitive cubic Bravais lattice, with unit cell length 9.15462 Angstroms.

The ZrO_{6} octahedra are only slightly distorted from a regular conformation, and all oxygen sites in a given octahedron are related by symmetry. The W_{2}O_{8} unit is made up of two crystallographically distinct WO_{4} tetrahedra, which are not formally bonded to each other. These two types of tetrahedra differ with respect to the W-O bond lengths and angles. The WO_{4} tetrahedra are distorted from a regular shape since one oxygen is unconstrained (an atom that is bonded only to the central tungsten (W) atom), and the three other oxygens are each bonded to a zirconium atom (i.e. the corner-sharing of polyhedra).

The structure has P2_{1}3 space group symmetry at low temperatures. At higher temperatures, a centre of inversion is introduced by the disordering of the orientation of tungstate groups, and the space group above the phase transition temperature (~180C) is Pa$\bar3$.

Octahedra and tetrahedra are linked together by sharing an oxygen atom. In the image, note the corner-touching between octahedra and tetrahedra; these are the location of the shared oxygen. The vertices of the tetrahedra and octahedra represent the oxygen, which are spread about the central zirconium and tungsten. Geometrically, the two shapes can "pivot" around these corner-sharing oxygens, without a distortion of the polyhedra themselves. This pivoting is what is thought to lead to the negative thermal expansion, as in certain low frequency normal modes this leads to the contracting 'RUMs' mentioned above.

== High pressure forms ==
At high pressure, zirconium tungstate undergoes a series of phase transitions, first to an amorphous phase, and then to a U_{3}O_{8}-type phase, in which the zirconium and tungsten atoms are disordered.

== Zirconium tungstate-copper system ==
Through hot-isostatically pressing (HIP) a ZrW_{2}O_{8}-Cu composite (system) can be realized. Work done by C. Verdon and D.C. Dunand in 1997 used similarly sized zirconium tungstate and copper powder in a low carbon steel can coated with Cu, and they were HIPed under 103MPa pressure for 3 hours at 600 °C. A control experiment was also conducted, with only a heat treatment (i.e., no pressing) for the same powder mixture also under 600 °C for 3 hours in a quartz tube gettered with titanium.

The results from X-ray diffraction (XRD) in the graph in Verdon & Dunand's paper shows expected products. (a) is from the as received zirconium tungstate powder, (b) is the result from the control experiment, and (c) is the ceramic product from the HIP process. Apparently there are new phases formed according to Spectrum (c) with no ZrW_{2}O_{8} left. While for the control experiment only partial amount of ZrW_{2}O_{8} was decomposed.

While complex oxides containing Cu, Zr, and W were believed to be created, selected area diffraction (SAD) of the ceramic product has proven the existence of Cu_{2}O as precipitates after reaction. A model consisted of two concurrent processes were surmised (as presented): (b) the decomposition of the ceramic and loss of oxygen under low oxygen partial pressure at high temperature leads to Cu_{2}O formation; (c) copper diffuses into the ceramic and forms new oxides that absorb some oxygen upon cooling.

Since only very few oxides, those of noble metals which are very expensive, are less stable than Cu_{2}O and Cu_{2}O was believed to be more stable than ZrW_{2}O_{8}, kinetic control of the reaction must be taken into account. For example, reducing reaction time and temperature helps alleviate the residual stress caused by different phases of the ceramic during reaction, which could lead to a delamination of the ceramic particles from the matrix and an increase in the CTE.
