= Negative thermal expansion =

Process in physical chemistry

Density of water

Negative thermal expansion (NTE) is an unusual physicochemical process in which some materials contract upon heating, rather than expand as most other materials do. The most well-known material with NTE is water at 0 to 3.98 °C. Also, the density of solid water (ice) is lower than the density of liquid water at standard pressure. Water's NTE is the reason why water ice floats, rather than sinks, in liquid water. Materials which undergo NTE have a range of potential engineering, photonic, electronic, and structural applications. For example, if one were to mix a negative thermal expansion material with a "normal" material which expands on heating, it could be possible to use it as a thermal expansion compensator that might allow for forming composites with tailored or even close to zero thermal expansion.

== Origin of negative thermal expansion ==
There are a number of physical processes which may cause contraction with increasing temperature, including transverse vibrational modes, rigid unit modes and phase transitions.

In 2011, Liu et al. showed that the NTE phenomenon originates from the existence of high pressure, small volume configurations with higher entropy, with their configurations present in the stable phase matrix through thermal fluctuations. They were able to predict both the colossal positive thermal expansion (in cerium) and zero and infinite negative thermal expansion (in Fe_{3}Pt). Alternatively, large negative and positive thermal expansion may result from the design of internal microstructure.

== Negative thermal expansion in close-packed systems ==
Negative thermal expansion is usually observed in non-close-packed systems with directional interactions (e.g. ice, graphene, etc.) and complex compounds (e.g. Cu_{2}O, ZrW_{2}O_{8}, beta-quartz, some zeolites, etc.). However, in a paper, it was shown that negative thermal expansion (NTE) is also realized in single-component close-packed lattices with pair central force interactions. The following sufficient condition for potential giving rise to NTE behavior is proposed for the interatomic potential, $\Pi(x)$, at the equilibrium distance $a$:
$$\Pi'''(a) >  0,$$
where $\Pi'''(a)$ is shorthand for the third derivative of the interatomic potential at the equilibrium point:
$$\Pi'''(a) = \left.\frac{d^3 \Pi(x)}{dx^3}\right|_{x=a}$$

This condition is (i) necessary and sufficient in 1D and (ii) sufficient, but not necessary in 2D and 3D. An approximate necessary and sufficient condition is derived in a paper
$$\Pi'''(a)a > -(d-1)\Pi''(a),$$
where $d$ is the space dimensionality. Thus in 2D and 3D negative thermal expansion in close-packed systems with pair interactions is realized even when the third derivative of the potential is zero or even negative. Note that one-dimensional and multidimensional cases are qualitatively different. In 1D thermal expansion is caused by anharmonicity of interatomic potential only. Therefore, the sign of thermal expansion coefficient is determined by the sign of the third derivative of the potential. In multidimensional case the geometrical nonlinearity is also present, i.e. lattice vibrations are nonlinear even in the case of harmonic interatomic potential. This nonlinearity contributes to thermal expansion. Therefore, in multidimensional case both $\Pi''$ and $\Pi'''$ are present in the condition for negative thermal expansion.

== Materials ==
Perhaps one of the most studied materials to exhibit negative thermal expansion is zirconium tungstate (ZrW_{2}O_{8}). This compound contracts continuously over a temperature range of 0.3 to 1050 K (at higher temperatures the material decomposes). Other materials that exhibit NTE behaviour include other members of the AM_{2}O_{8} family of materials (where A = Zr or Hf, M = Mo or W) and HfV_{2}O_{7} and ZrV_{2}O_{7}, though HfV_{2}O_{7} and ZrV_{2}O_{7} only in their high temperature phase starting at 350 to 400 K. A_{2}(MO_{4})_{3} also is an example of controllable negative thermal expansion. Cubic materials like ZrW_{2}O_{8} and also HfV_{2}O_{7} and ZrV_{2}O_{7} are especially precious for applications in engineering because they exhibit isotropic NTE i.e. the NTE is the same in all three dimensions making it easier to apply them as thermal expansion compensators.

Ordinary ice shows NTE in its hexagonal and cubic phases at very low temperatures (below –200 °C). In its liquid form, pure water also displays negative thermal expansivity below 3.984 °C.

ALLVAR Alloy 30, a titanium-based alloy, shows NTE over a wide temperature range, with a -30 ppm/°C instantaneous coefficient of thermal expansion at 20 °C. ALLVAR Alloy 30's negative thermal expansion is anisotropic. This commercially available material is used in the optics, aerospace, and cryogenics industries in the form of optical spacers that prevent thermal defocus, ultra-stable struts, and washers for thermally-stable bolted joints.

Carbon fibers show NTE between 20°C and 500°C. This property is utilized in tight-tolerance aerospace applications to tailor the CTE of carbon fiber reinforced plastic components for specific applications/conditions, by adjusting the ratio of carbon fiber to plastic and by adjusting the orientation of the carbon fibers within the part.

Quartz (SiO_{2}) and a number of zeolites also show NTE over certain temperature ranges. Fairly pure silicon (Si) has a negative coefficient of thermal expansion for temperatures between about 18 K and 120 K. Cubic Scandium trifluoride has this property which is explained by the quartic oscillation of the fluoride ions. The energy stored in the bending strain of the fluoride ion is proportional to the fourth power of the displacement angle, unlike most other materials where it is proportional to the square of the displacement. A fluorine atom is bound to two scandium atoms, and as temperature increases the fluorine oscillates more perpendicularly to its bonds. This draws the scandium atoms together throughout the material and it contracts. ScF_{3} exhibits this property from 10 to 1100 K above which it shows the normal positive thermal expansion. Shape memory alloys such as NiTi are a nascent class of materials that exhibit zero and negative thermal expansion.

== Applications ==
Forming a composite of a material with (ordinary) positive thermal expansion with a material with (anomalous) negative thermal expansion could allow for tailoring the thermal expansion of the composites or even having composites with a thermal expansion close to zero. Negative and positive thermal expansion hereby compensate each other to a certain amount if the temperature is changed. Tailoring the overall thermal expansion coefficient (CTE) to a certain value can be achieved by varying the volume fractions of the different materials contributing to the thermal expansion of the composite.

Especially in engineering there is a need for having materials with a CTE close to zero i.e. with constant performance over a large temperature range e.g. for application in precision instruments. But also in everyday life materials with a CTE close to zero are required. Glass-ceramic cooktops like Ceran cooktops need to withstand large temperature gradients and rapid changes in temperature while cooking because only certain parts of the cooktops will be heated while other parts stay close to ambient temperature. In general, due to its brittleness temperature gradients in glass might cause cracks. However, the glass-ceramics used in cooktops consist of multiple different phases, some exhibiting positive and some others exhibiting negative thermal expansion. The expansion of the different phases compensate each other so that there is not much change in volume of the glass-ceramic with temperature and crack formation is avoided.

An everyday life example for the need for materials with tailored thermal expansion is dental fillings. If the fillings tend to expand by an amount different from the teeth, for example when drinking a hot or cold drink, it might cause a toothache. If dental fillings are, however, made of a composite material containing a mixture of materials with positive and negative thermal expansion then the overall expansion could be precisely tailored to that of tooth enamel.
